= Crucifixion Altarpiece =

Retable by Jacques de Baerze and Melchior Broederlam

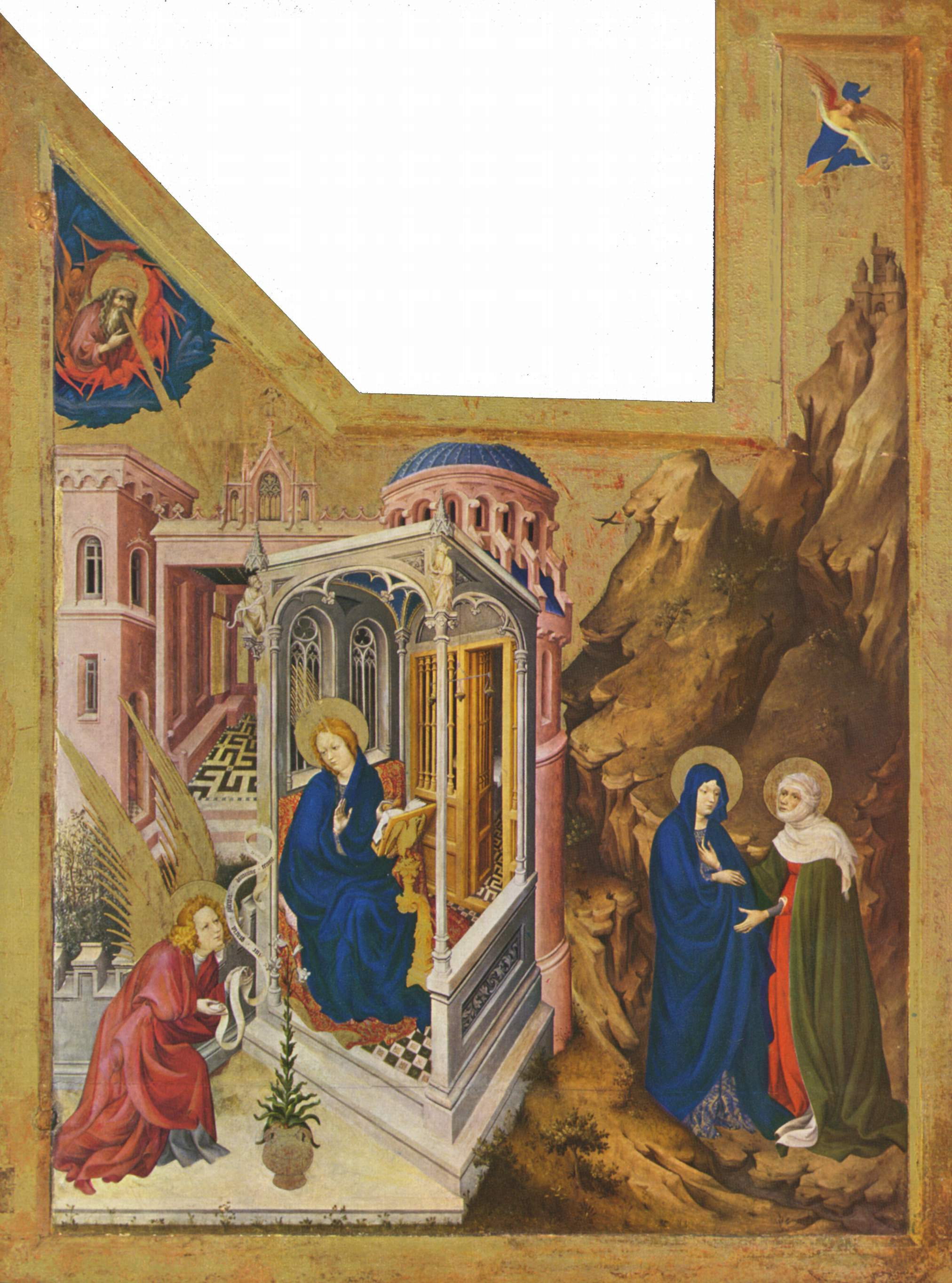
- Artist: Melchior Broederlam, Jacques de Baerze
- Year: 1390s
- Medium: Tempera on wood
- Location: Musée des Beaux-Arts de Dijon, Dijon

The Crucifixion Altarpiece is a multimedia altarpiece, with painted exterior panels by Melchior Broederlam and an interior carved by Jacques de Baerze. It is also known as the Retable of the Crucifixion and the Dijon Altarpiece. It was commissioned by Philip the Bold, Duke of Burgundy for the Chartreuse de Champmol. This altarpiece is considered one of the most important examples of the International Gothic style. The open view of the altarpiece depicts Christ's life, beginning when he was conceived and ending with a representation of his burial, whereas the exterior illustrates the Annunciation, the Visitation, the Presentation in the Temple, and the Flight to Egypt.

== Style ==
=== International Gothic Style ===
The two panels painted by Broederlam are examples of the International Gothic style. The aforementioned term of "International Gothic" was first utilized by art historians to characterize a type of painting that emerged in European courts during the late 14th to mid-15th century. The International Gothic Style is defined by its decorative conventionalization paired with the abundant implementation of colors and gold decorations. Furthermore, the International Gothic Style delicately places naturalistic details into a fairly illogical space.

As per the International Gothic Style, Broederlam's painted panels utilize vivid colors and gold leaf, through the uses of pink, red, blue, and abundance of gilding. The paintings also have elongated figures that are placed in naturalistic landscapes despite being in an impossible pictorial space beside one another. Furthermore, the figures have delicate facial features, with small intricate details by Broederlam.

== Closed View ==
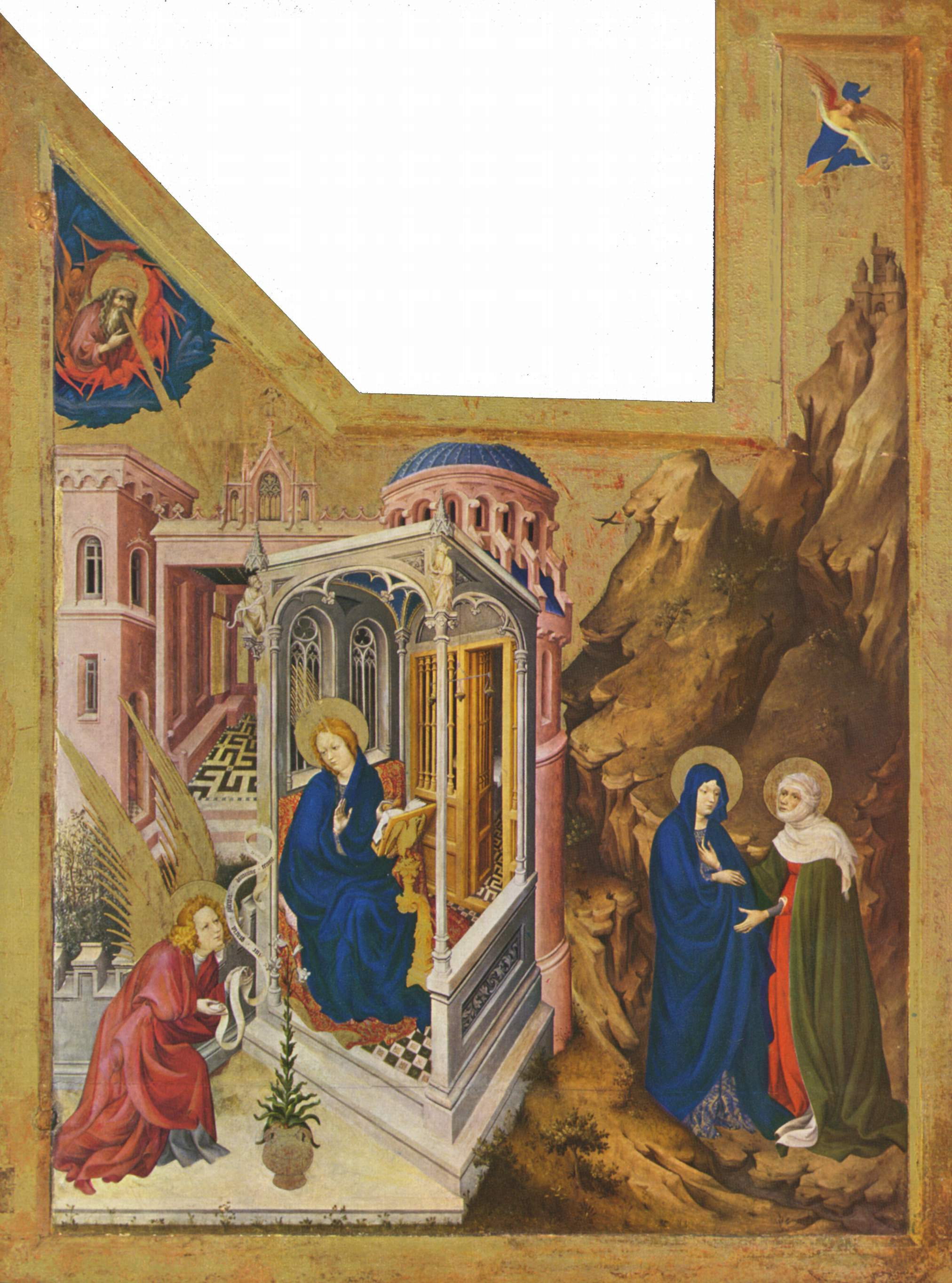
The Left Side of the Altarpiece

=== Left Side ===
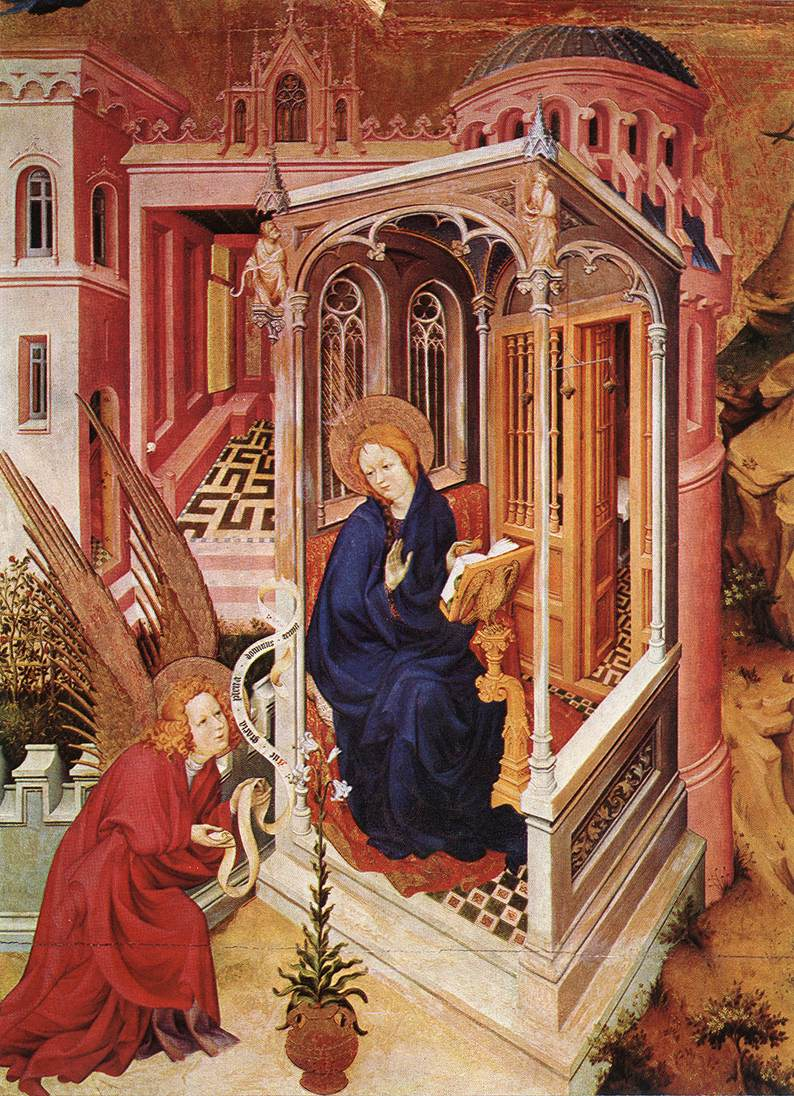
The Annunciation Scene

==== Annunciation ====
The left side of the altarpiece depicts the Annunciation scene, wherein the angel Gabriel appears before Mary and announces that she will be the mother to the son of God. Erwin Panofsky, a German art historian, theorized that the architecture surrounding the Annunciation scene makes purposeful contrasts between the older Byzantine style and the newer Gothic style. Moreover, Panofsky thought that this was part of reflecting the Dispensations. He believed that the older Byzantine structures symbolized the Dispensation of Mosaic Law and the newer Gothic structure, where the Annunciation is set, is representative of the beginning of the Dispensation of Grace. Mary is shown wearing her blue robe as she sits in front of a lectern that holds a book of hours.

As the angel Gabriel appears beside her, Mary is depicted turning her head and raising her hand to recognize his presence before her. Mary is pronounced as the mother of the Savior through Gabriel's banderole. Through golden rays that radiate from God the Father's mouth in the upper left of the panel, the Holy Spirit enters Mary. The walled garden behind Gabriel, known as the hortus conclusus, and the vase of white lilies in front of him, considered to be a symbol of the Virgin's purity, emphasize the immaculate origin of Christ's conception.

==== Visitation ====
The following scene, to the right of the Annunciation, is the Visitation, portrays the moment when the Virgin Mary, donning blue clothing once again, meets Elizabeth, the mother of John the Baptist. As per biblical tradition, both Mary and Elizabeth were pregnant during this visit. John the Baptist, from within his mother’s womb, recognized Christ as the Savior and he “leapt with joy”. The two women in Broederlam’s work, are shown standing in front of a mountainous and rugged landscape, at the top of which is a fortified village. Broederlam also chose to include to sprinkle the landscape with small trees and bushes, while painting a single bird flying throughout the sky, with small trees and bushes scattered across the scene. A lone bird flies through the sky, its silhouette contrasting with the gold leaf background.

=== Right Side ===
==== The Presentation ====
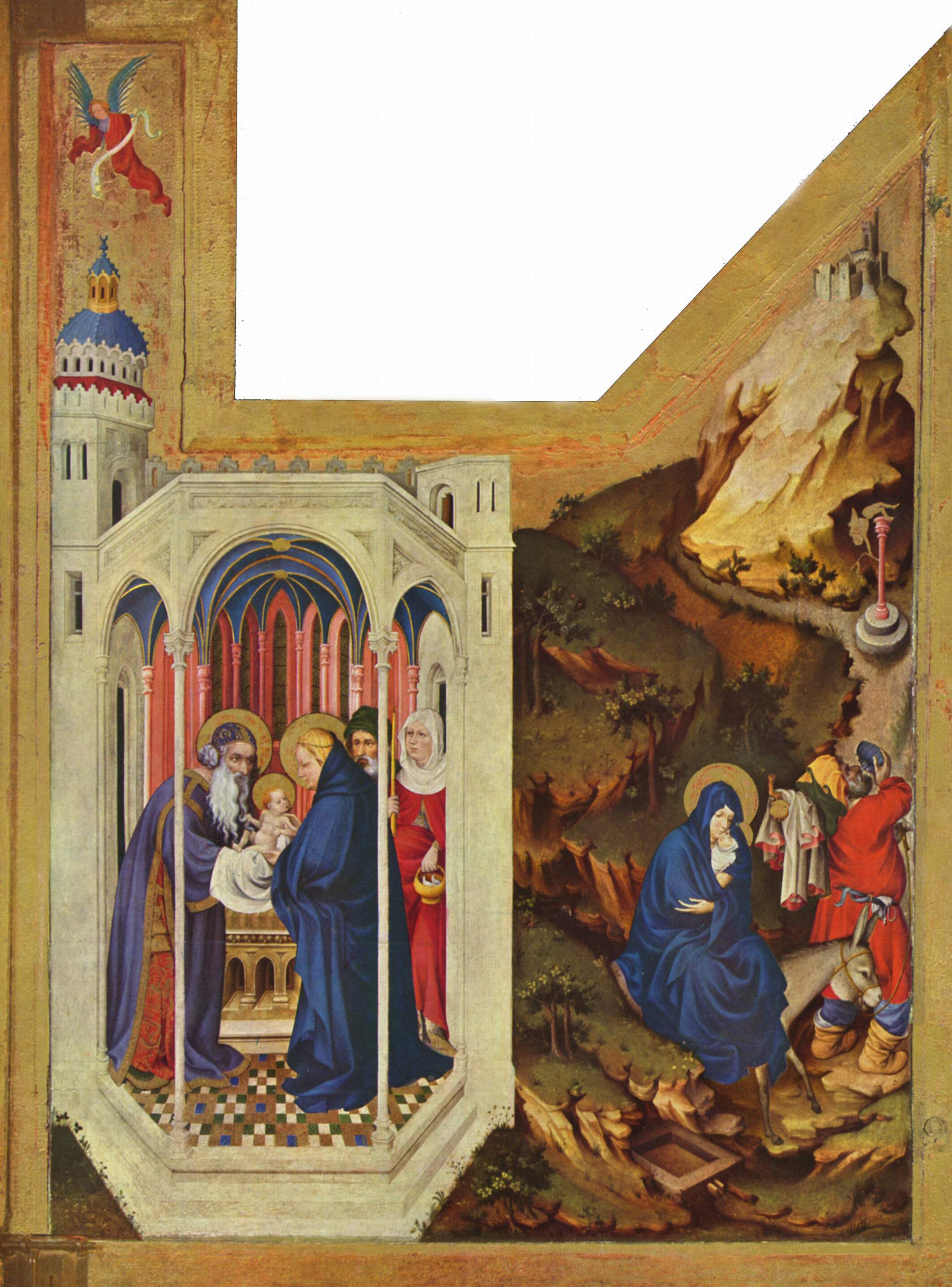
The Right Side of the Altarpiece

On the panel's right side Broederlam painted the Presentation in the Temple, which depicts when Christ was presented to a priest by the Virgin Mary, who holds up Christ over a golden altar inside a temple. The architecture of the temple uses characteristics of Romanesque architecture with the illustration of a rounded arch, in combination with aspects of Gothic architecture with the ribbed groin vault and pointed arch. The pairing and juxtaposition of the two architectural styles is thought to be reflective of the shift between the Old and New Testaments.

==== The Flight to Egypt ====
The Flight to Egypt is depicted to the right of the Presentation in the Temple. The Flight to Egypt is illustrating the journey taken by Jesus, Mary, and Joseph, when they had to flee from King Herod. The Virgin Mary holds Christ Child as they ride on the back of a donkey. Her blue mantle is depicted as enveloping Christ to indicate her maternal protection of her child.

Joseph is shown leading the way to Egypt as he drinks from a bag of water, calling attention to the arduous nature of their journey. The rugged path the Holy Family is traveling on leads into the background of the painting where Broederlam illustrated a fortified city. Midway in their path there is a golden idol that drops down from a pink column, sighting the shift into the new Christian era that was harkened by Christ's birth.

== Open View ==
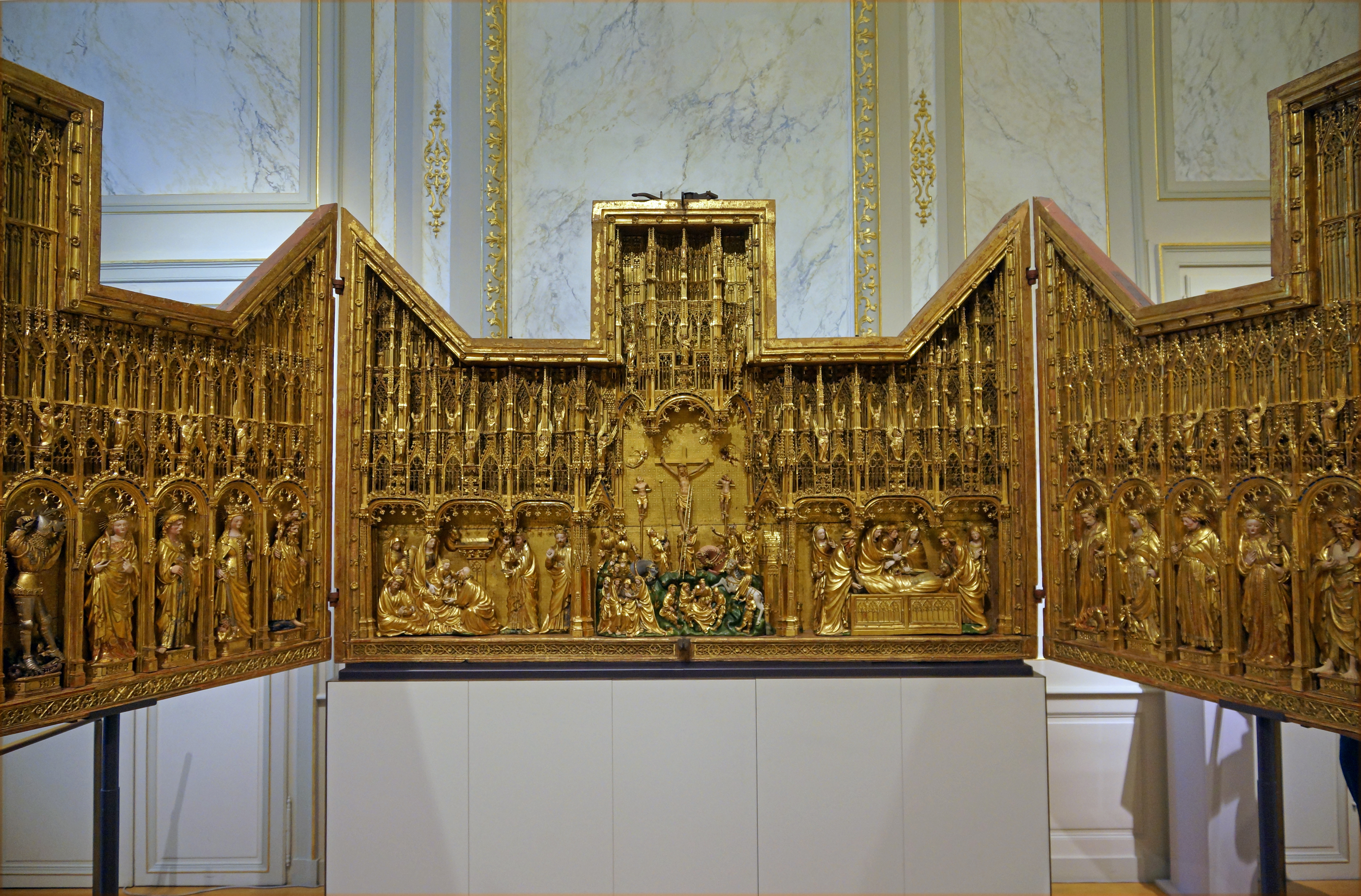
Open View of the Altarpiece

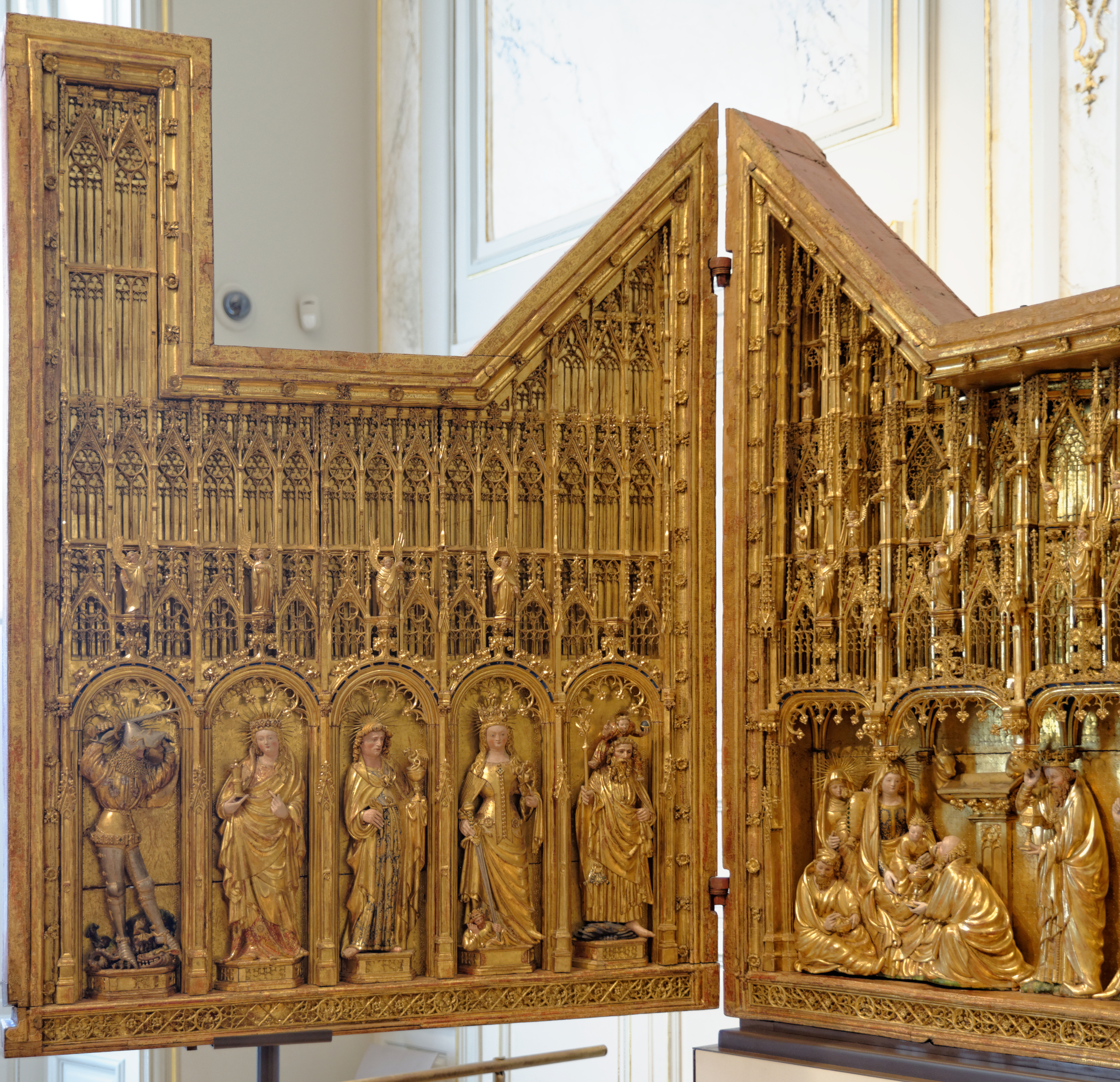
Open view of the left wing

The interior of the Crucifixion Altarpiece was carved by Jaques de Baerze and has carvings that reflect the life of Christ, from when he was conceived to when he was buried. It is gilded and painted wood standing at 167 cm high. The width of the middle measures at 252 cm, while each shutter is 125 cm.

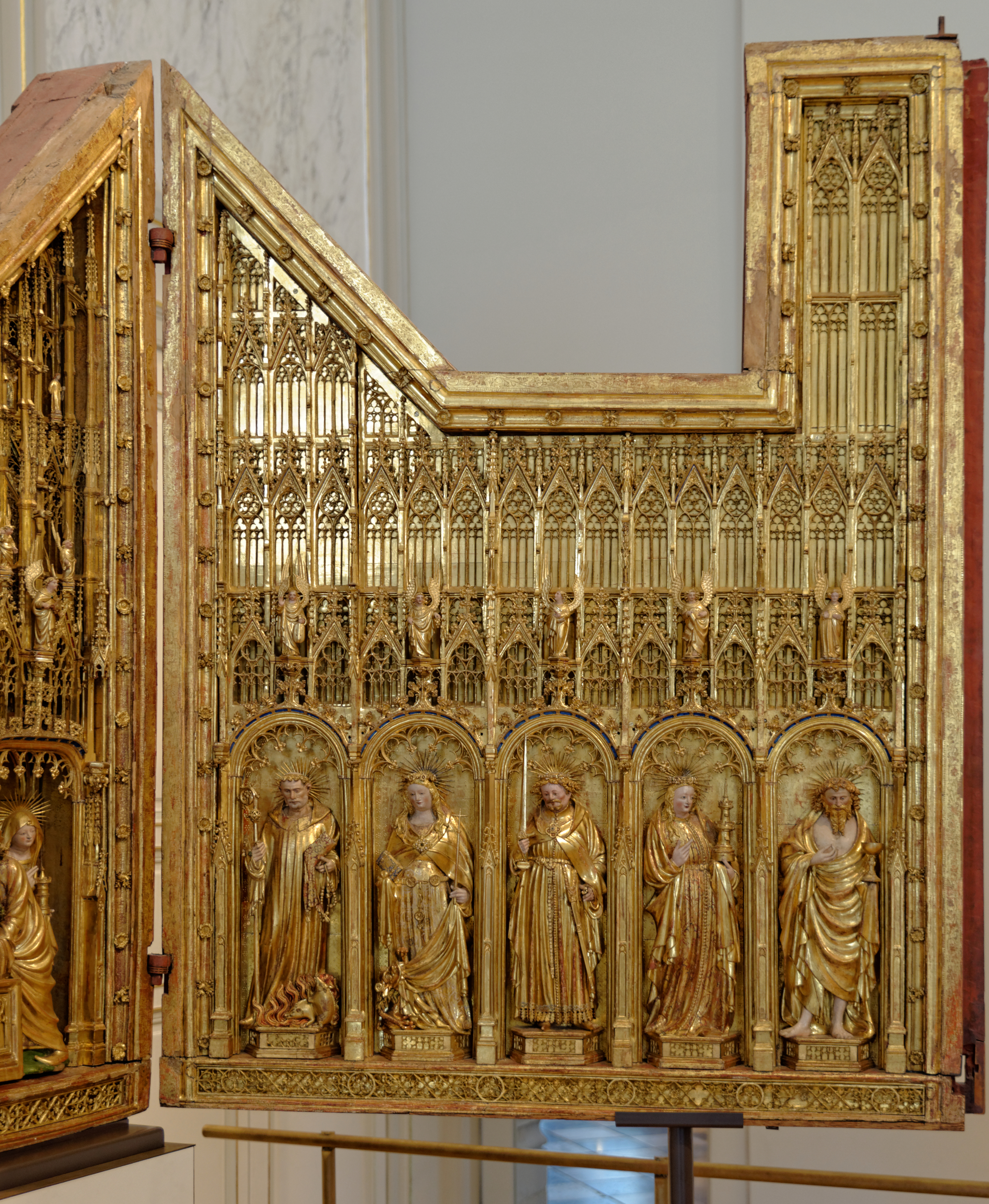
Open view of the right wing

In the center of the altarpiece is the Crucifixion scene, with the Adoration of the Magi and the Entombment on the left and right respectively. The inside of both the left and right wings have carvings of five standing saints. The standing saints on the left wing are figures of Saints George, Mary Magdalen, John the Evangelist, Catherine, and Christopher. Carved into the right wing are Saints Anthony, Marguerite, Louis, Barbara, and Joseph.

== History ==
=== Commission ===
The Crucifixion Altarpiece was commissioned by Philip the Bold, the Duke of Burgundy. The Duke commissioned the altarpiece for the Chartreuse de Champmol, a monastery that he founded, located outside of Dijon, France.

The Duke of Burgundy, admired Jacques de Baerze's previous works that were commissioned by Louis II de Mâle, Count of Flanders and Duke of Brabant, wherein De Baerze created two carved altarpieces. Duke Philip was impressed by the intricate and detailed carvings by De Baerze and then ordered the carved wooden altarpiece to be created in 1390 for the abby church in Dijon, which was intended to be his dynasty's eventual necropolis. In Augusts of 1391, the altarpiece was transported from Dendermonde to Burgundy, but later were returned to Flanders, where they were given to Broederlam for the painting and gilding. The iconography of Broederlam and De Baerze were created to be companions and complement one another. Furthermore the collaboration between the two artists resulted in one of the earliest remaining examples of sculpted retables that have painted panels.

In August 1399, the altarpiece was then returned to Champmol and were judged approvingly by a committee, which consisted of Clause Sluter, Jean Malouel, Hennequin de Haacht, and Guillaume, the nephew of a previous court painter named Jean de Beaumetz. By the following November, the triptych by Broederlam and De Baerze was placed on an altar gifted by Jean, Duc de Berry.
