= Jean Malouel =

Dutch artist

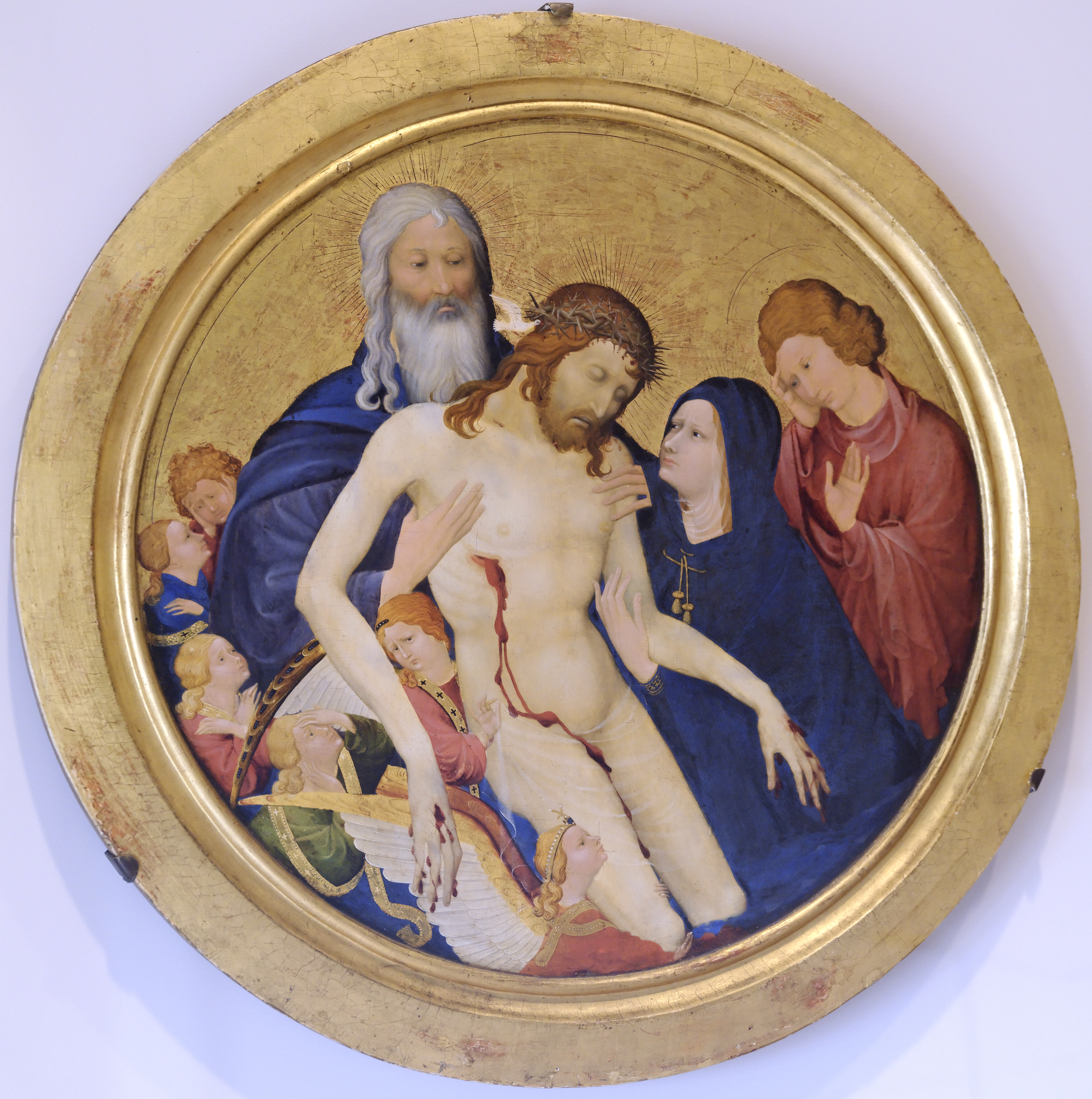
- Pietà with the Holy Trinity by Jean Malouel, Louvre
- Born: c. 1365; Nijmegen
- Died: 1415
- Known for: Painting

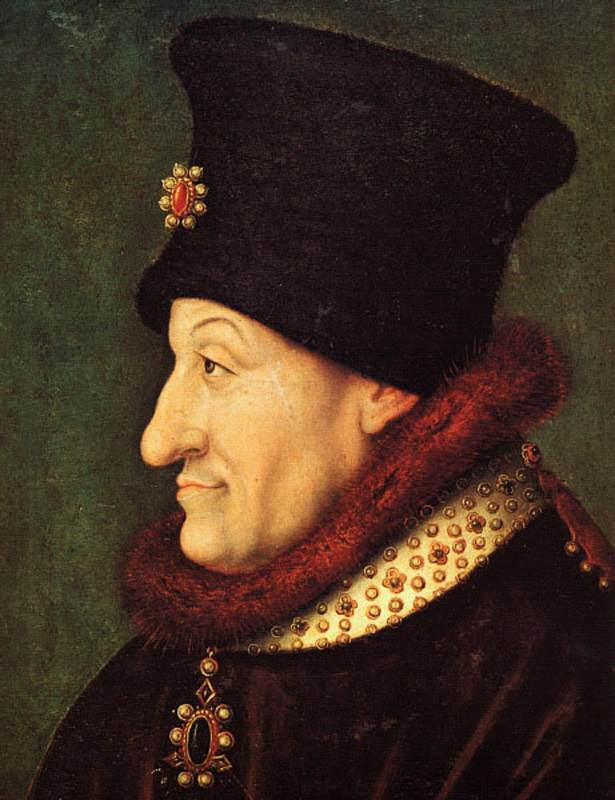
Philip the Bold in later life, after Jean Malouel

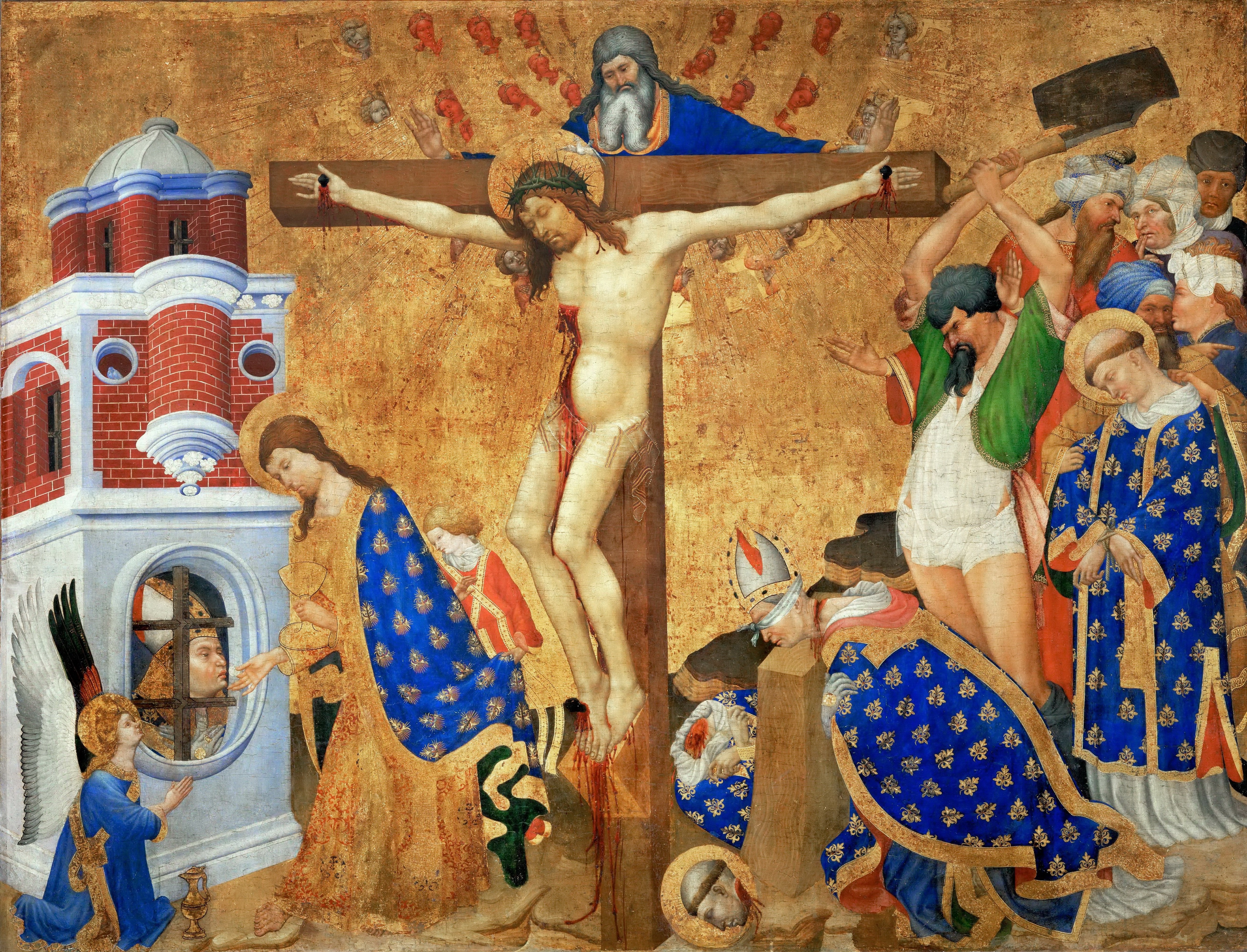
The Last Communion and Martyrdom of Saint Denis, by Henri Bellechose, perhaps begun by Malouel, completed 1416

Jean Malouel, or Jan Maelwael in his native Dutch, (c. 1365 – 1415) was a Dutch artist who was the court painter of Philip the Bold, Duke of Burgundy and his successor John the Fearless, working in the International Gothic style.

== Documented life ==
He was presumably born in the old Ottonian city of Nijmegen, then in the Duchy of Guelders, which was incorporated in the modern Netherlands in 1543 after the definitive victory of the Dukes of Burgundy in a series of conflicts knows as the Guelders Wars. He probably trained there in the workshop of his father, the artist Willem Maelwael (his uncle was also an artist), and is recorded as an artist in 1382. He was the uncle of the famous manuscript illuminators, the three Limbourg brothers, whom he introduced to Philip's service around 1400. Malouel also worked as an illuminator, but seems mostly to have produced larger works.

Malouel is recorded as working in Paris painting armorial decorations on cloth (probably for banners) for Isabelle of Bavaria, Queen of France, in 1396–97, but by August 1397 he was in Dijon, the capital of the Duchy of Burgundy, where he succeeded Jean de Beaumetz (d. 1396) to the position of court painter to Philip the Bold, with the rank of valet de chambre. He retained these positions until his death, with a salary higher than that of Beaumetz or the sculptor Claus Sluter, and lived in Dijon. In 1405, soon after the death of Philip, he returned to Nijmegen to marry Heilwig van Redinchaven, bringing her back to Dijon. Another visit of over two months was recorded in 1413. In 1415 he died in Dijon, leaving Heilwig and four children. She received a pension from the Duke, and returned to Nijmegen, where she became involved in lengthy litigation over Malouel's estate there.

== Attributed works ==
Among a number of other commissions, many for decorative painting in the palaces, Malouel is recorded as receiving in 1398 the wood for five altarpiece panels for the Chartreuse of Champmol, Philip's new dynastic burial place near Dijon, as well as painting the Well of Moses there, sculpted by Claus Sluter, the base of which survives with some of its colouring. From 1401, Herman of Cologne, perhaps a specialist gilder, is recorded as Malouel's assistant, or perhaps foreman of a number of apprentices. Painting the "Well", and gilding all the upper parts, was a large job, on which they were occupied between 1401 and 1404. Malouel also painted Philip's tomb at Champmol, when the sculptors finally finished it after Sluter's death.

Malouel's oeuvre on panel remains controversial; the most generally accepted painting of his to survive is the Pietà tondo in the Louvre, the first true tondo of the Renaissance, though this is not accepted by Châtelet. This has Philip's coat of arms painted on the back, so should predate his death in 1404, and the "unusual iconography of the piece clearly links it to [Champmol]", which was dedicated to the Holy Trinity, who all appear. The style of the work mixes Northern and Sienese elements, in a fashion characteristic of the International Gothic court art of the period. Although painted in the traditional tempera, the work uses transparent glazes in a way that was to be greatly developed in the work of Jan van Eyck after Malouel's death. Another of Phillip's Netherlandish artists, Melchior Broederlam, was already producing works partly in oil paint for Champmol.

The large (162 x 211 cm) altarpiece, also in the Louvre, of the Martyrdom of St Denis with the Trinity (or The Last Communion and Martyrdom of Saint Denis), also from Champmol, may have been begun by Malouel but completed by Henri Bellechose (his only known work), after Malouel's death. The ducal accounts record the provision of pigments (but not gold) to Bellechose to complete ("parfaire" = "perfect") a "painting of the life of St Denis", known to have been a subject of Malouel's, and some see a difference in style among the figures, while others do not. Snyder and Châtelet support Malouel's participation, but this is disputed, the case against being set out in an article of 1961 by Nicole Reynaud (in French). For Châtelet the St Denis altarpiece and the large tondo in the Louvre are two of the five altarpieces commissioned in 1398. Bellechose, who is not documented before Malouel's death, succeeded him as valet and court painter; Châtelet suggests he may have been in his workshop for years, and suggests he was responsible for the large tondo over ten years earlier, thus reversing the traditional attributions for these two famous works.

Malouel is also believed to have been the originator of a portrait image of Philip of about 1400 which survives only in versions believed to be later. He is recorded as working on a portrait of John the Fearless for the King of Portugal in 1413, and there were also portraits of Philip and John in the choir at Champmol (as we know from when Philip the Good ordered one of him to be added). A later version in the Musée Condé in Chantilly has been suggested as a copy of the Malouel image type of John. A large Madonna and Child, unearthed in 1960 in Berlin and now on loan to the Gemäldegalerie, Berlin, has also been attributed to Malouel, as has another in the Louvre. It is believed the Berlin picture was one wing of a diptych opposite a portrait of John the Fearless, which would be the first known example of this format, later very common in Netherlandish painting. It was perhaps also for Champmol.

A number of other works are, or have been, attributed to Malouel or his workshop, including a smaller Pietà tondo in the Louvre, the "Antwerp-Baltimore polyptych", also sometimes associated with Melchior Broederlam, and a damaged Entombment of Christ in Troyes.
