= Jacques de Baerze =

Flemish sculptor

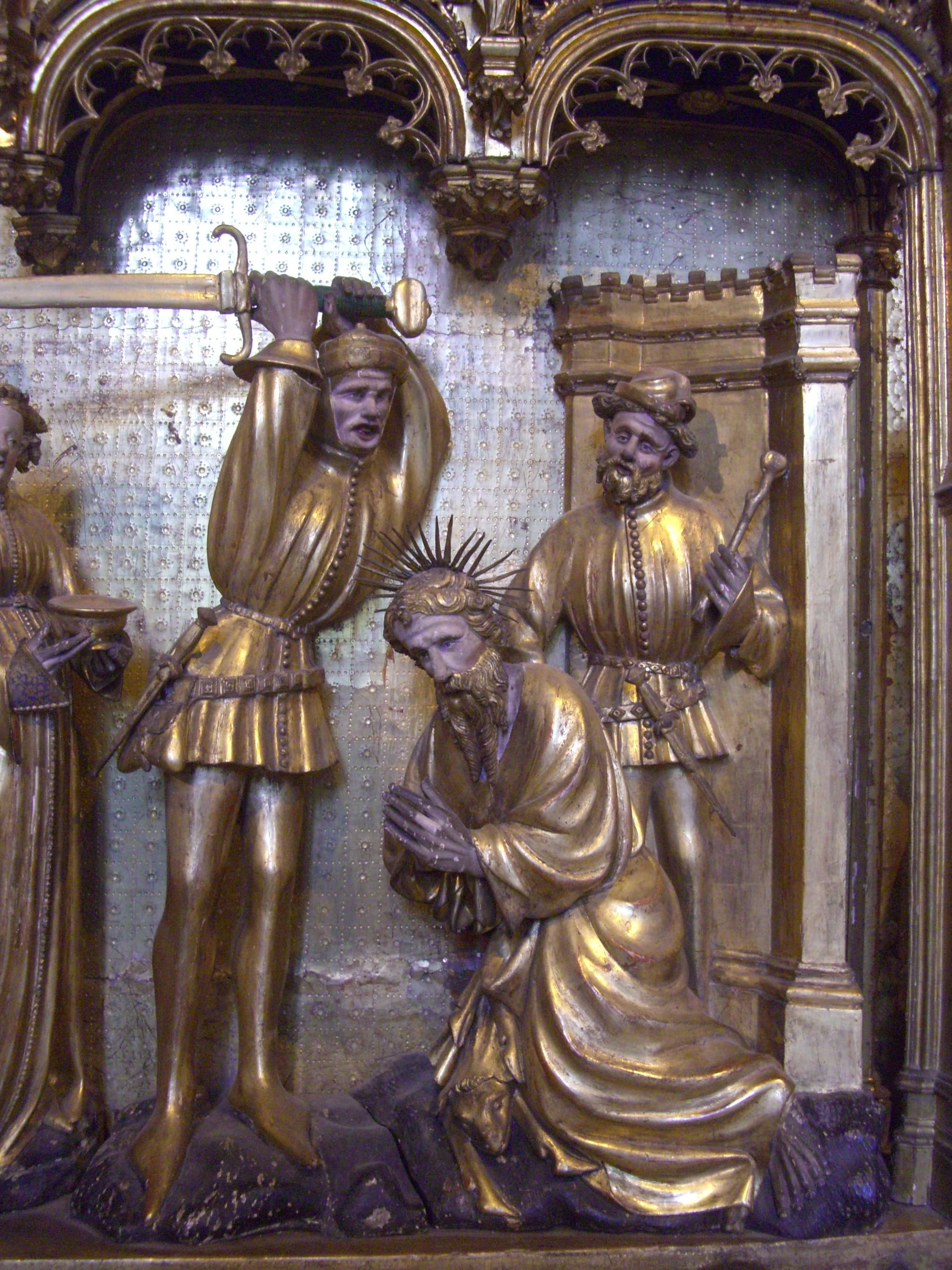
Scene from the smaller Champmol altarpiece; the Execution of John the Baptist

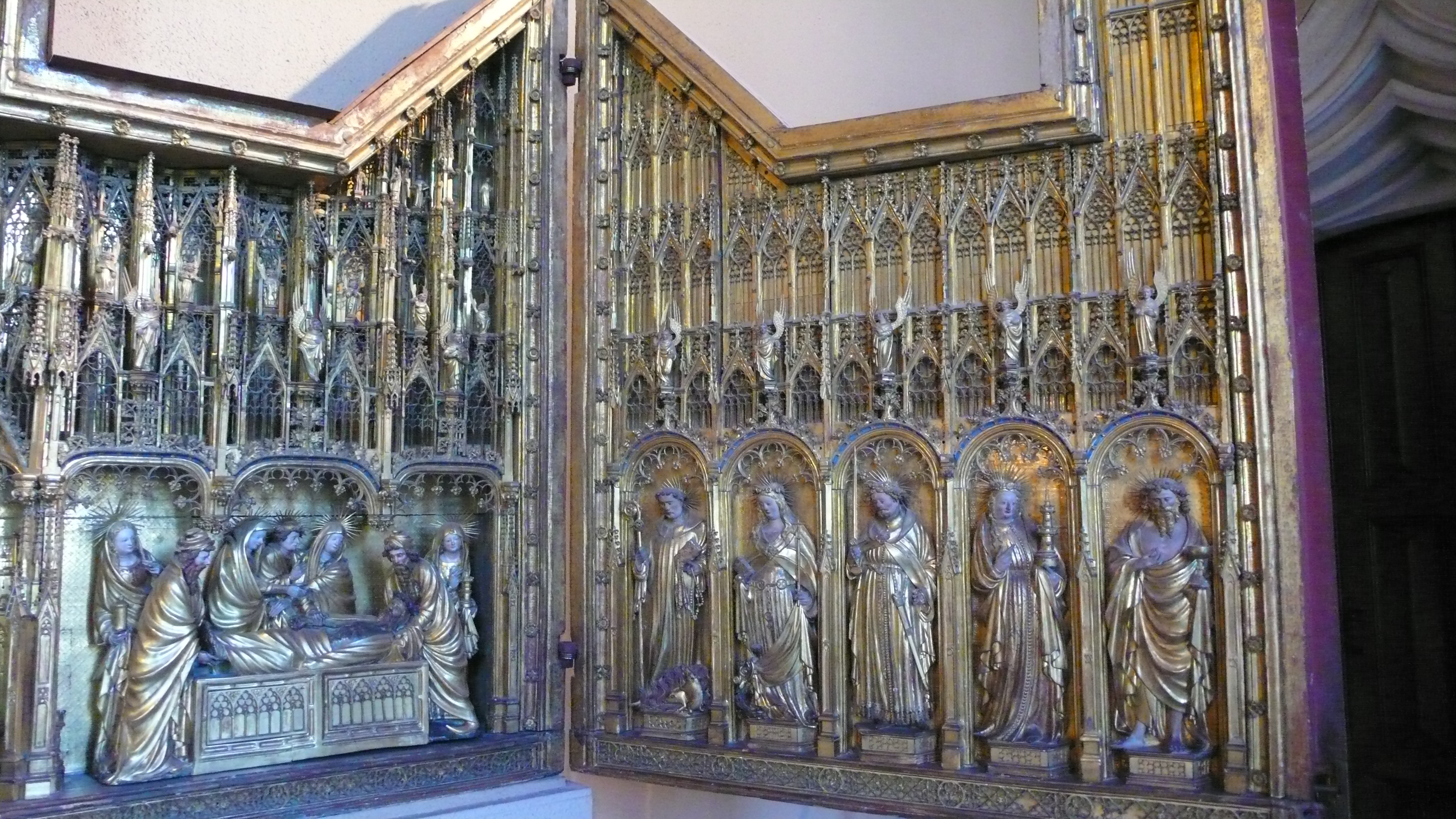
The Retable of the Crucifixion; detail of the right side

Jacques de Baerze (active before 1384, died after 1399) was a Flemish sculptor in wood, two of whose major carved altarpieces survive in Dijon, now in France, then the capital of the Duchy of Burgundy.

De Baerze probably came from Ghent, and lived in Dendermonde (Termonde in French) some thirty kilometres away, not far from Antwerp and Brussels. He was considered a well-established master by Louis II of Flanders, Duke of Brabant before his death in January 1384, evidenced by the record of two commissions from Louis II to produce carved altarpieces, though these works no longer exist. These altarpieces were intended for the chapel of the castle of Dendermonde, and the hospice of the Cistercian abbey of Bijloke, then just outside Ghent.

De Baerze's work was noticed by Philip the Bold, Duke of Burgundy, Louis II's son-in-law and successor as Count of Flanders. In 1385 Philip had founded a Carthusian monastery, the Charterhouse of Champmol, then just outside Dijon, as the dynastic burial-place of the Burgundian Valois, and was filling it with impressive works of art. In 1390, he commissioned de Baerze to create two similar altarpieces for Champmol: one, now known as the Altar of Saints and Martyrs for the chapter house, and the larger, now known as the Retable of the Crucifixion, for the main altar of the church. Both are triptychs with hinged wings, carved on the interior; the exterior panels were painted by his court artist Melchior Broederlam (another Fleming who also previously worked for Louis); this was a common arrangement for a grand altarpiece. These painted outer panels only survive for the larger of the two retables. The triptychs would normally be shown closed, displaying the paintings, but opened to show the carvings for feast days.

The iconography of the two artists' elements was designed to complement each other, with a painted sequence of scenes from the Infancy of Christ and within, carved scenes of the Adoration of the Magi, the Crucifixion in the centre, and the Entombment of Christ, flanked by saints on the inside of the side-panels. Above is elaborate Gothic tracery with small figures of saints and angels. The whole of both works is either gilded or painted. The Altar of Saints and Martyrs is 159 cm high, and 252 cm wide with the wings open. For the Retable of the Crucifixion the equivalent figures are 167 cm and 252 cm.

The retables were transported to Dijon from Dendermonde in August 1391, but were returned to Flanders a year later. There, the painting and gilding was finished by Broederlam at his studio in Ypres; guild regulations usually mandated that the carving and painting or guilding were performed by members of different guilds. They were returned to Champmol, approved by a committee including Claus Sluter, and installed by the end of 1399, after which de Baerze disappears from documented records.

The altarpieces were moved after the French Revolution to the Musée des Beaux-Arts de Dijon, along with the Broederlam panels, which now, unlike at the time of their creation, receive more attention than the carvings, as they are of great significance in the development of Early Netherlandish painting, and painting is generally of greater interest to modern art historians than sculpture. De Baerze's two retables are probably the earliest Netherlandish examples to survive complete, although there were evidently many more such works in existence by this date, and the form probably developed first in the Low Countries. With hardly any works from the period to compare to those in Dijon, it is hard to assess the originality of de Baerze, or his place in the tradition, though he clearly participates in the International Gothic style of the period. Presumably most of his work was for local churches and religious houses. In fact the iconoclasm after the Reformation was so destructive of Netherlandish wood-carved altars that only a few fragments survive there from the following eighty years, while Germany has many examples.

Other smaller carvings attributed to de Baerze survive, including the 28 cm high figure from an altar crucifix which formed part of the Champmol commission, now in the Art Institute of Chicago, and a St George in the Mimara Museum in Zagreb.

== The Retable of the Crucifixion ==
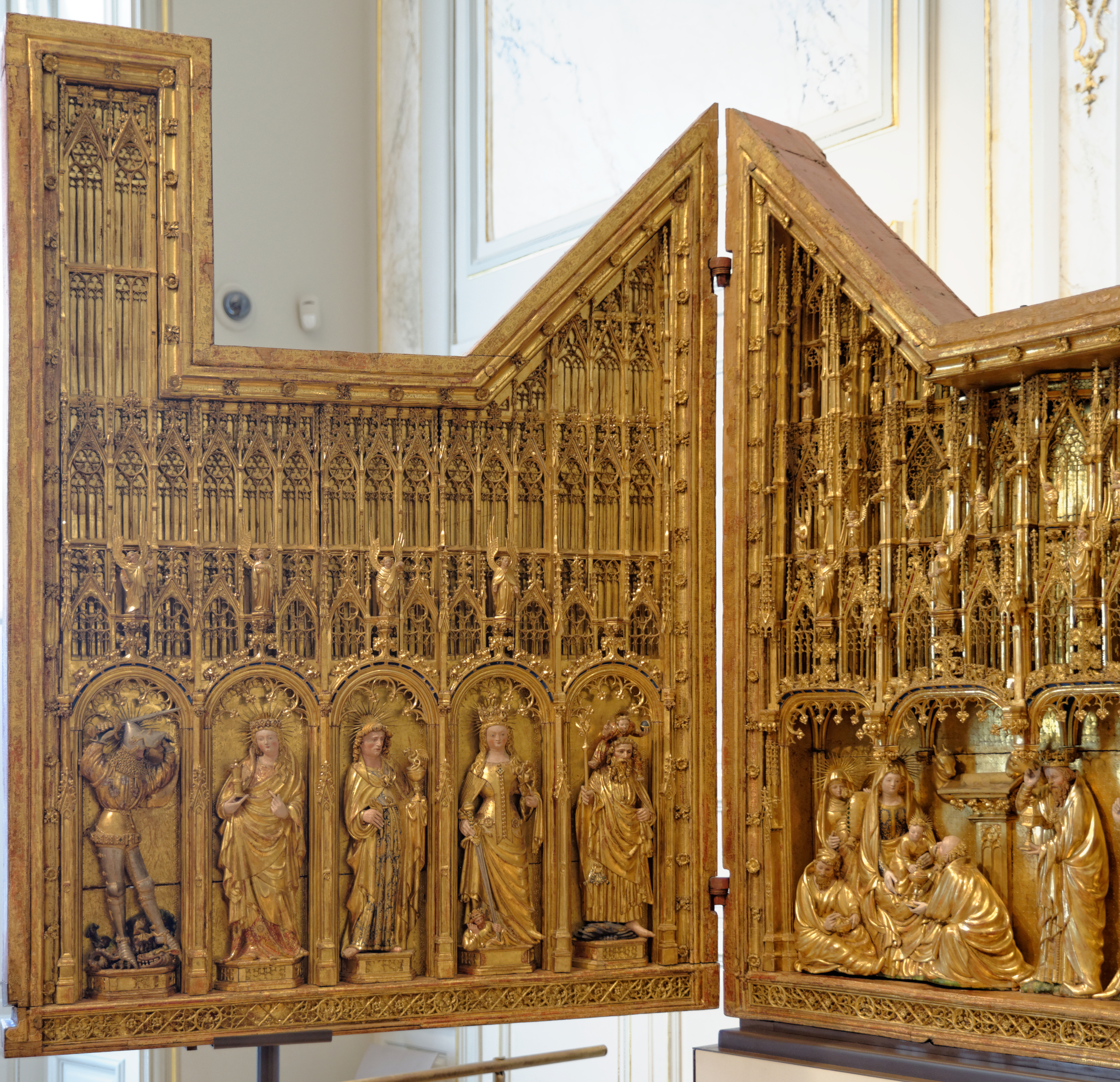
The Retable of the Crucifixion, left side.

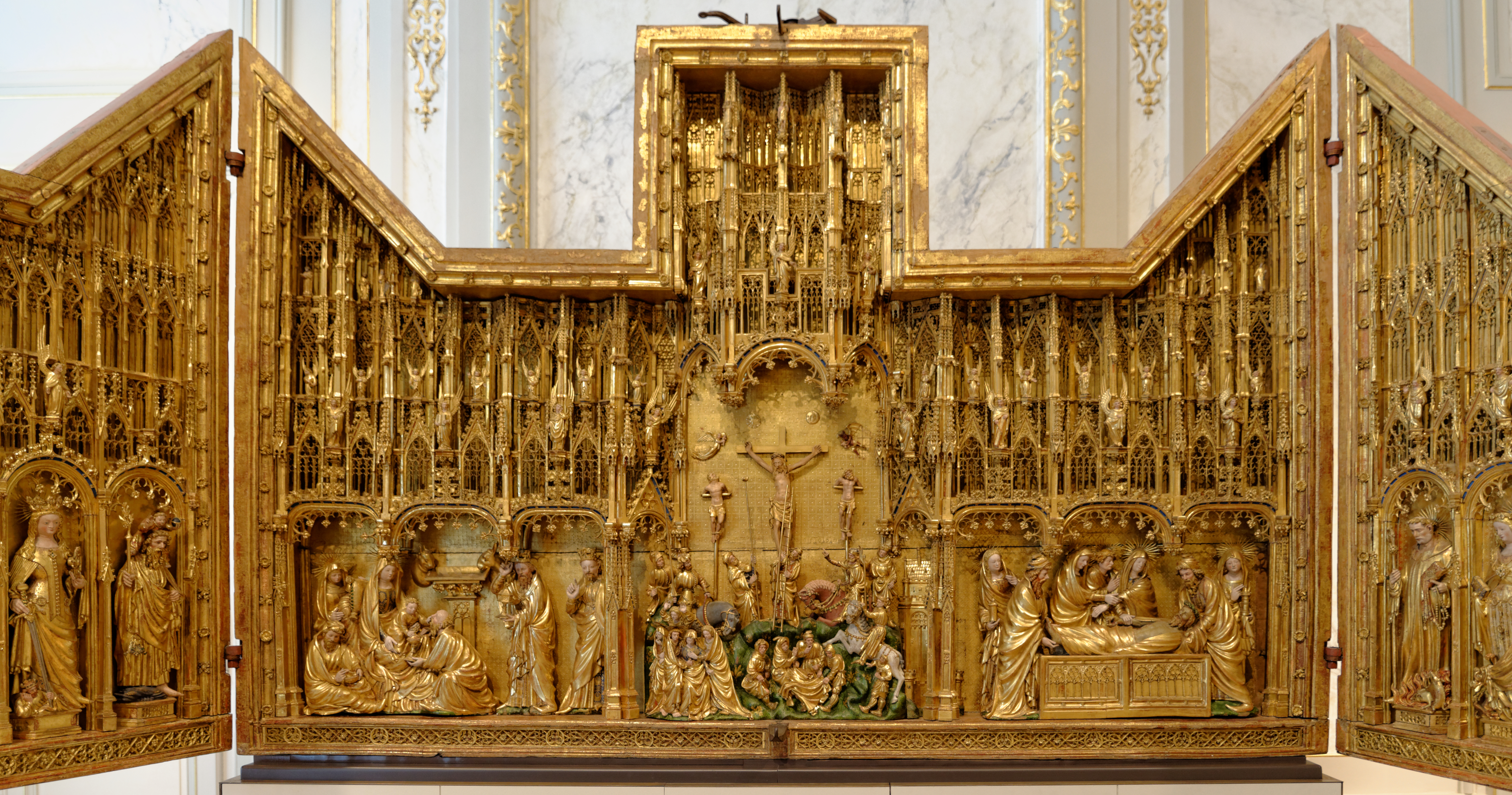
Retable of the crucifixion, central panel.

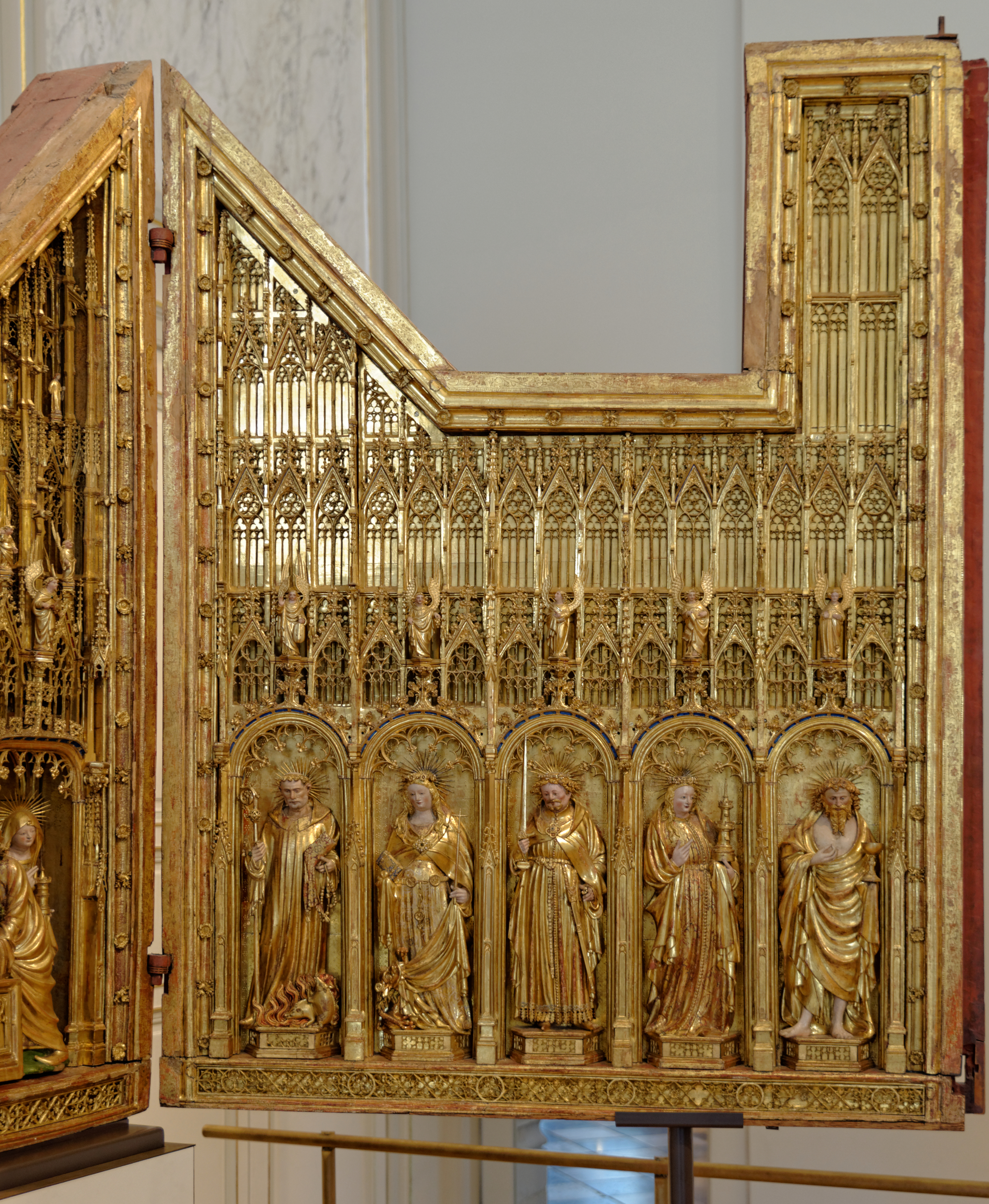
The Retable of the Crucifixion, right side.

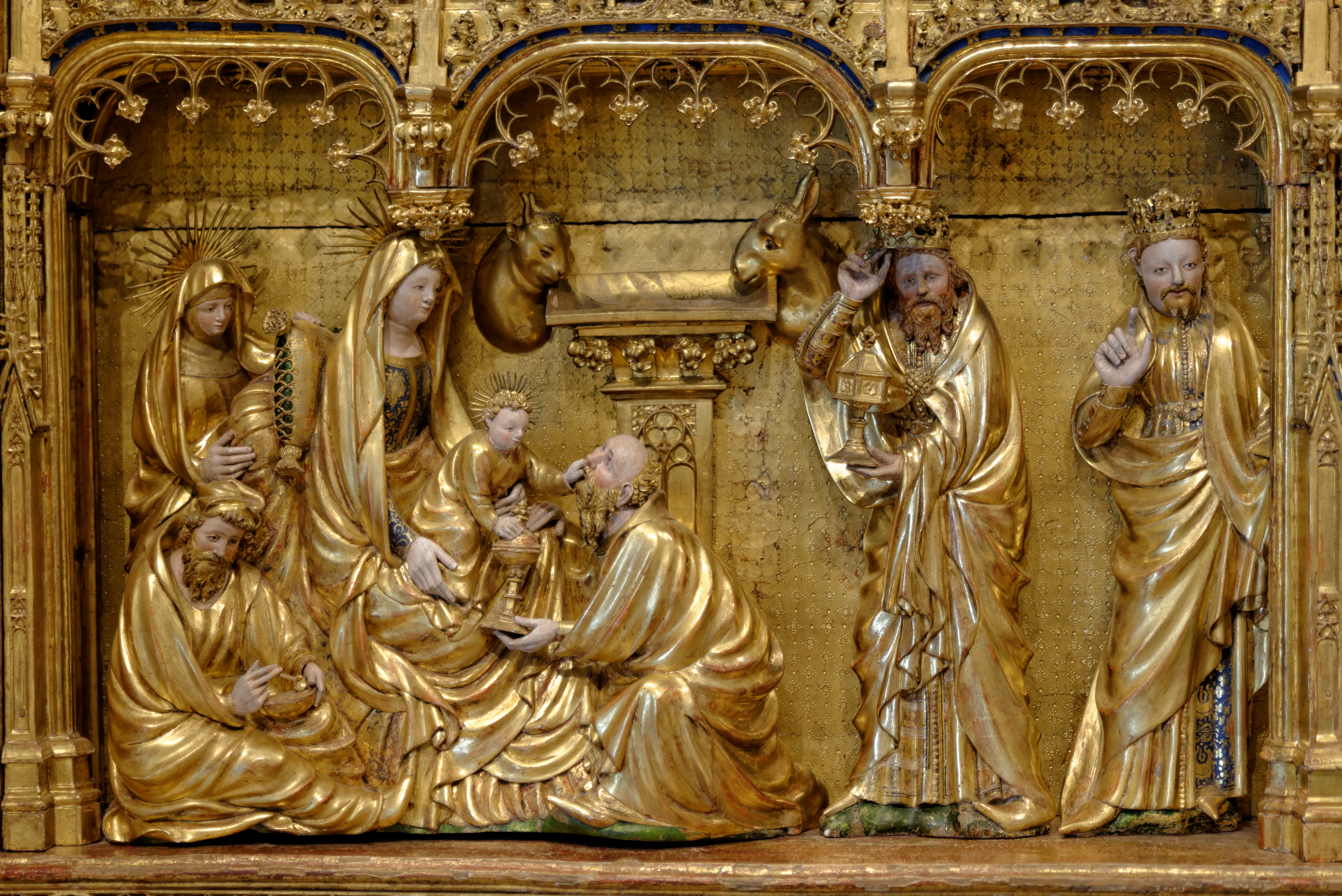
Detail: the Adoration of the Magi.

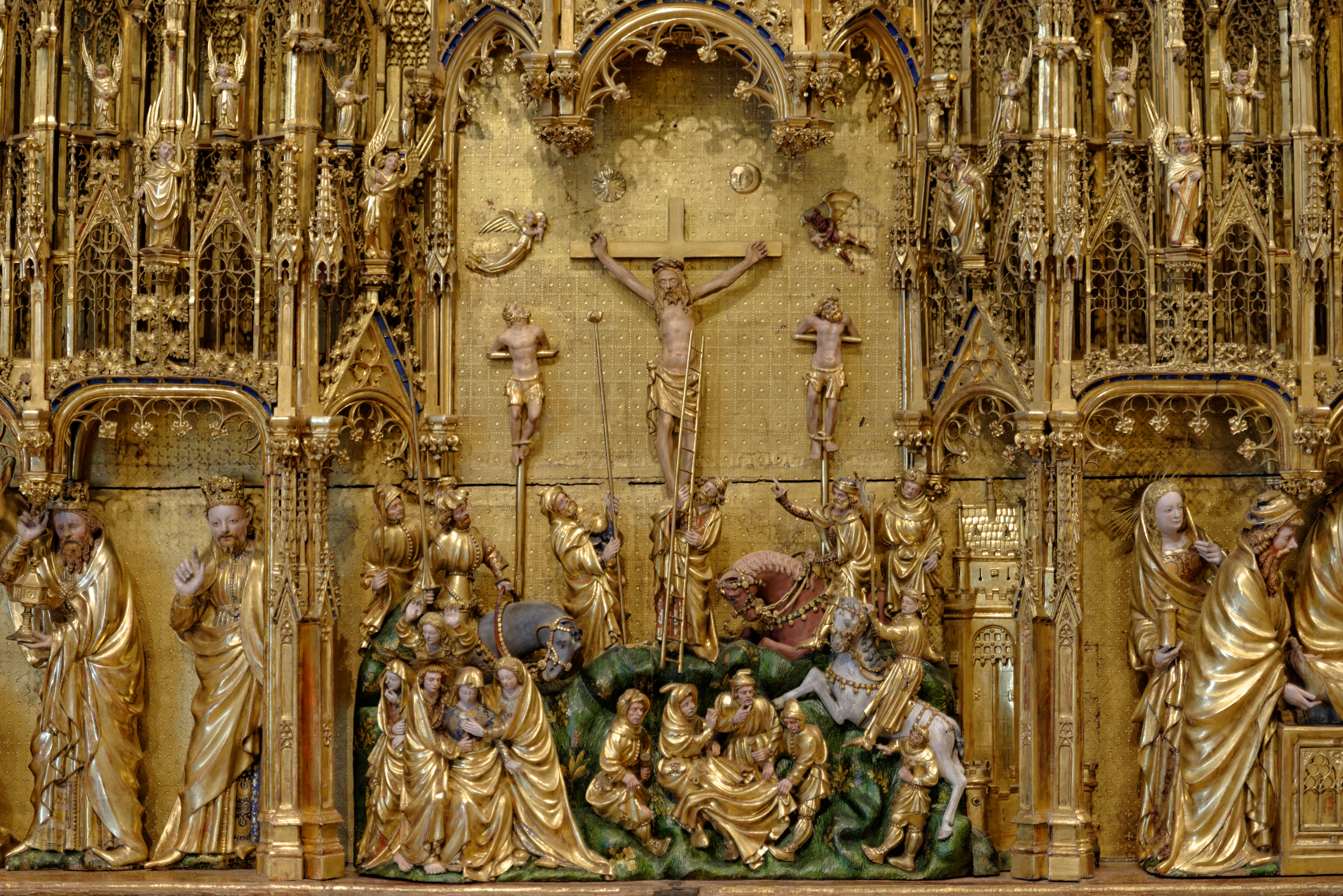
Détail: the Crucifixion.

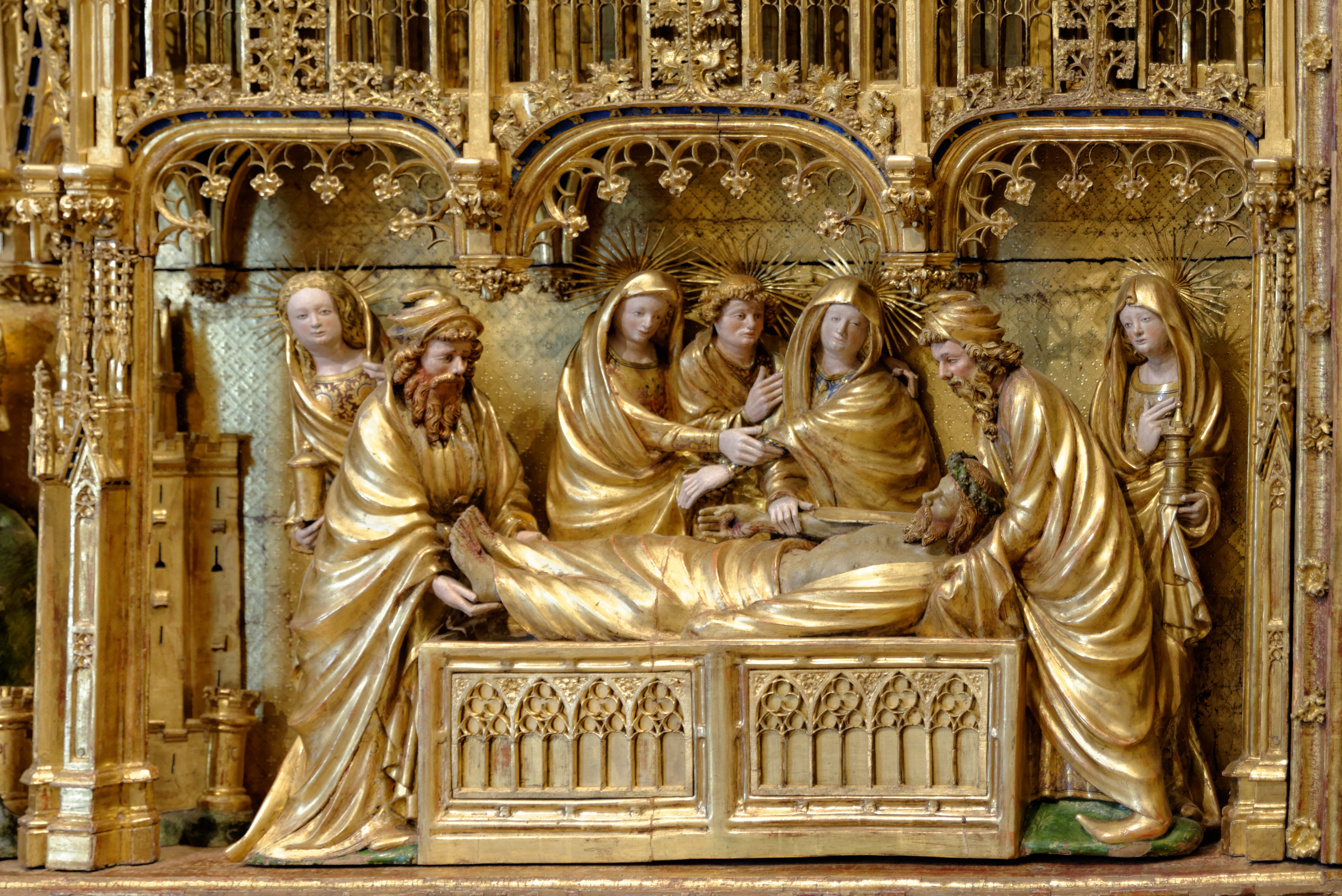
Detail: the entombment.
