= Champmol =

Carthusian monastery in Dijon, France

Coordinates: 47°19′18″N 5°01′02″E

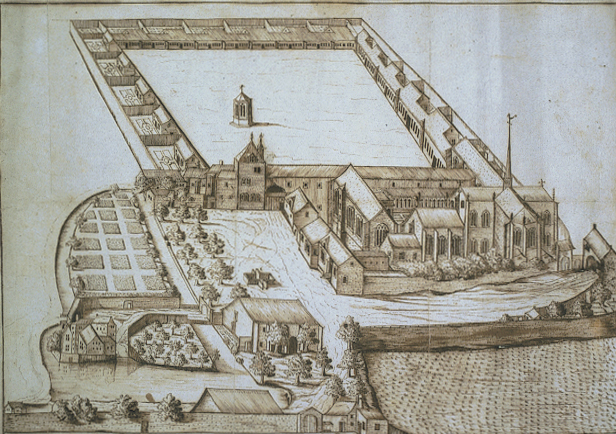
Champmol in 1686. The cottage-like hermitages of the monks can be seen surrounding the main cloister, with the Well of Moses in the middle.

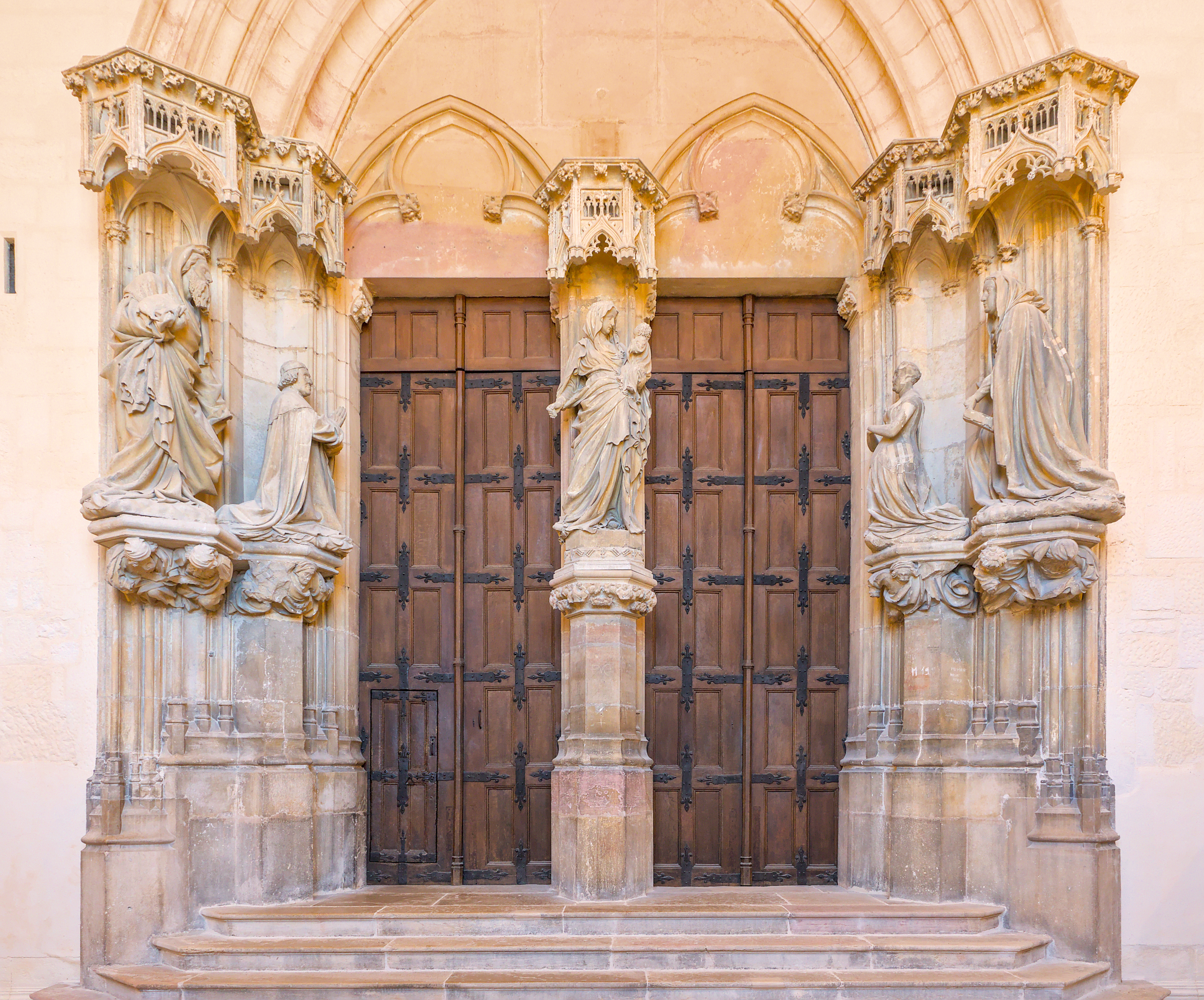
Philip the Bold and his wife kneel in the portal of the monastery church. Claus Sluter and workshop.

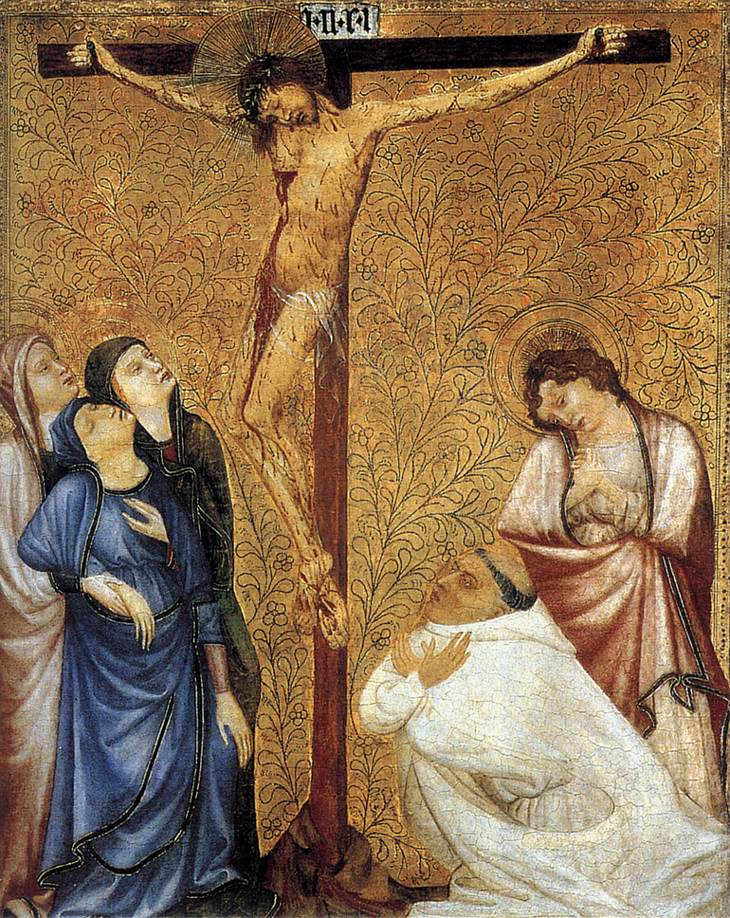
Each of the choir monks had one of these paintings in his hermitage, probably as the only decoration. Cleveland Museum of Art.

The Chartreuse de Champmol, formally the Chartreuse de la Sainte-Trinité de Champmol, was a Carthusian monastery on the outskirts of Dijon, which is now in France, but in the 15th century was the capital of the Duchy of Burgundy. The monastery was founded in 1383 by Duke Philip the Bold to provide a dynastic burial place for the Valois Dukes of Burgundy, and operated until it was dissolved in 1791, during the French Revolution.

Called "the grandest project in a reign renowned for extravagance", it was lavishly enriched with works of art, and the dispersed remnants of its collection remain key to the understanding of the art of the period.

== Founding ==
Purchase of the land and quarrying of materials began in 1377, but construction did not begin until 1383, under the architect Druet de Dammartin from Paris, who had previously designed the Duke's chateau at Sluis, and been an assistant in work at the Louvre. According to James Snyder his work at Champmol was "a somewhat conservative modification of the Late Gothic buildings of Paris". A committee of councillors from Dijon supervised the construction for the Duke, who was often elsewhere. By 1388 the church was consecrated, and most construction probably completed. The monastery was built for twenty-four choir monks, instead of the usual twelve in a Carthusian house, and two more were endowed to celebrate the birth in 1433 of Charles the Bold. These lived semi-hermitic lives in their individual small houses when not in the chapel. There would also have been non-ordained monks, servants, novices, and other workers.

When founded, Champmol was "two arrow shots" outside the city gates, but is now inside the modern city boundaries. At this time the city had about 10,000 inhabitants and was the largest in Burgundy proper, though smaller than the cities of the territories in the Netherlands recently inherited by the Duke through his wife. But Burgundy was held more securely than the often turbulent cities in the north, and represented the senior title of the dynasty. Over sixty members of the Capetian House of Burgundy, whom the Valois had succeeded in 1361, only two decades earlier, had been buried at Cîteaux Abbey to the south of Dijon. Champmol was intended to rival Cîteaux, Saint-Denis, where the Kings of France were buried, and other dynastic burial places.

Somewhat in contradiction to the Carthusian mission of tranquil contemplation, visitors and pilgrims were encouraged, the expenses of hospitality recompensed by the Dukes. In 1418 Papal indulgences were granted to those visiting the Well of Moses, further encouraging pilgrims. The ducal family had a private oratory overlooking the church (now destroyed), though their visits were in fact rare. The ducal accounts, which have fortunately survived, show major commissions for paintings and other works to complete the monastery continuing until about 1415, and further works were added after that at a slower rate by the Dukes and other donors.

The accounts for Champmol have survived in sufficient detail that Martin Warnke synthesized from them a view of the emerging status of court artists, and "the autonomous consciousness of art and artists" that would distinguish the world of art in the Early modern period.

== Tombs of the Dukes ==
The Valois dynasty of Burgundy had less than a century to run when the monastery was founded, and the number of tombs never approached that of their Capetian predecessors at Cîteaux – indeed there would hardly have been room in the choir of the church, where the monuments were. Only two monuments were ever erected, both in the same style with painted alabaster effigies with lions at their feet and angels with spread wings at their heads. Underneath the slab the effigies rested on, unpainted small (about 40 cm high) "pleurants" or mourners ("weepers" is the traditional English term) were set among Gothic tracery. These were described by Johan Huizinga in The Waning of the Middle Ages as "the most profound expression of mourning known in art, a funeral march in stone".

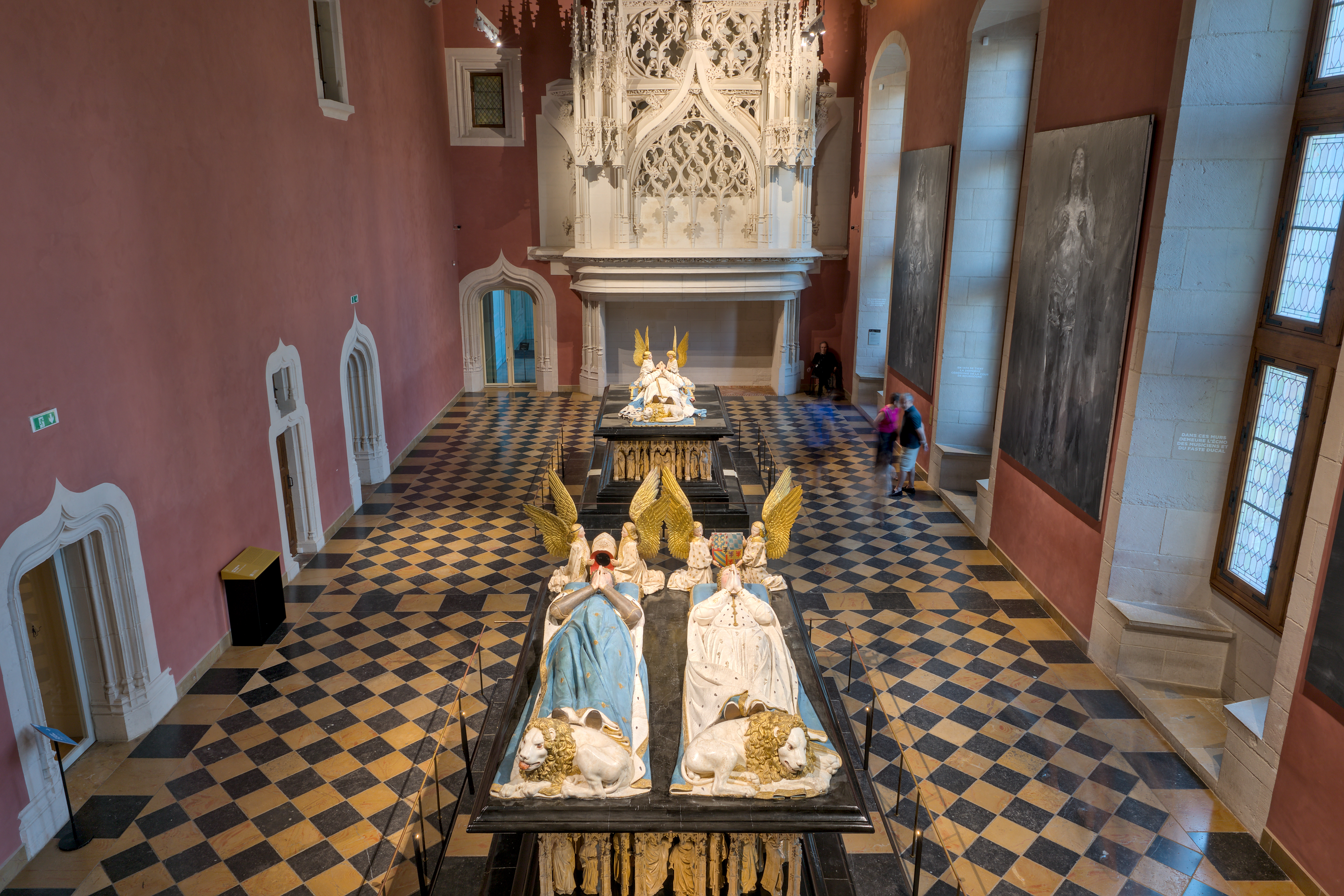
The tombs of the Dukes, now moved to the "Salle de Garde" of their palace in Dijon.

Philip the Bold died in 1404, and his wife Margaret III, Countess of Flanders, the following year. She had decided to rest her remains with those of her parents in Lille, and Philip had been planning a single monument for himself for over twenty years, having commissioned Jean de Marville in 1381. Work did not begin until 1384, and proceeded slowly, with Claus Sluter being put in charge in 1389. At the Duke's death in 1404, only two mourners and the framework were complete; John the Fearless gave Sluter four years to finish the job, but he died after two. His nephew and assistant, Claus de Werve took over and finished the sculptures in 1410. The effigies were painted by Malouel.

John expressed a wish for his own tomb, this time a double one with his Duchess Margaret of Bavaria, to resemble that of his father, but nothing was done, even after his death in 1419, until 1435, and in 1439 de Werve died without having managed to find suitable alabaster. In 1443 a Spaniard, Jean de La Huerta, was contracted, and sent drawings for the effigies. He completed most elements, but not the effigies, before leaving Dijon in 1456. Yet another master was brought in, and the monument finally installed in 1470, by which time Philip the Good was himself dead. He seems to have made no provision for a monument for himself, and had initially been buried in Bruges, where he died. His son Charles the Bold had the remains brought back to Champmol after some years, but no monument was ever planned. Charles himself was relocated from Nancy to Bruges by his great-grandson Charles V in 1558.

The second tomb repeats the design of the first, but with their execution spanning almost a century, stylistic differences can be seen, although some of the "pleurants" of the second tomb copy those of the first exactly. It is recorded that Philip the Good had a portrait of himself placed in the choir, where there were already those of the previous two Dukes. None of these are believed to have survived in the original, but surviving portraits may be copies of them.

After the Revolution, and the sale of the monastery, the tombs were carefully moved to Dijon Cathedral in 1792, as their historic importance was recognised. But in the following year the cathedral was converted into a Temple of Reason and the effigies were vandalised, so that what are now seen are reconstructions. Many elements, including ten "pleurants", were removed by genteel looters.

=== Gallery of the tombs ===
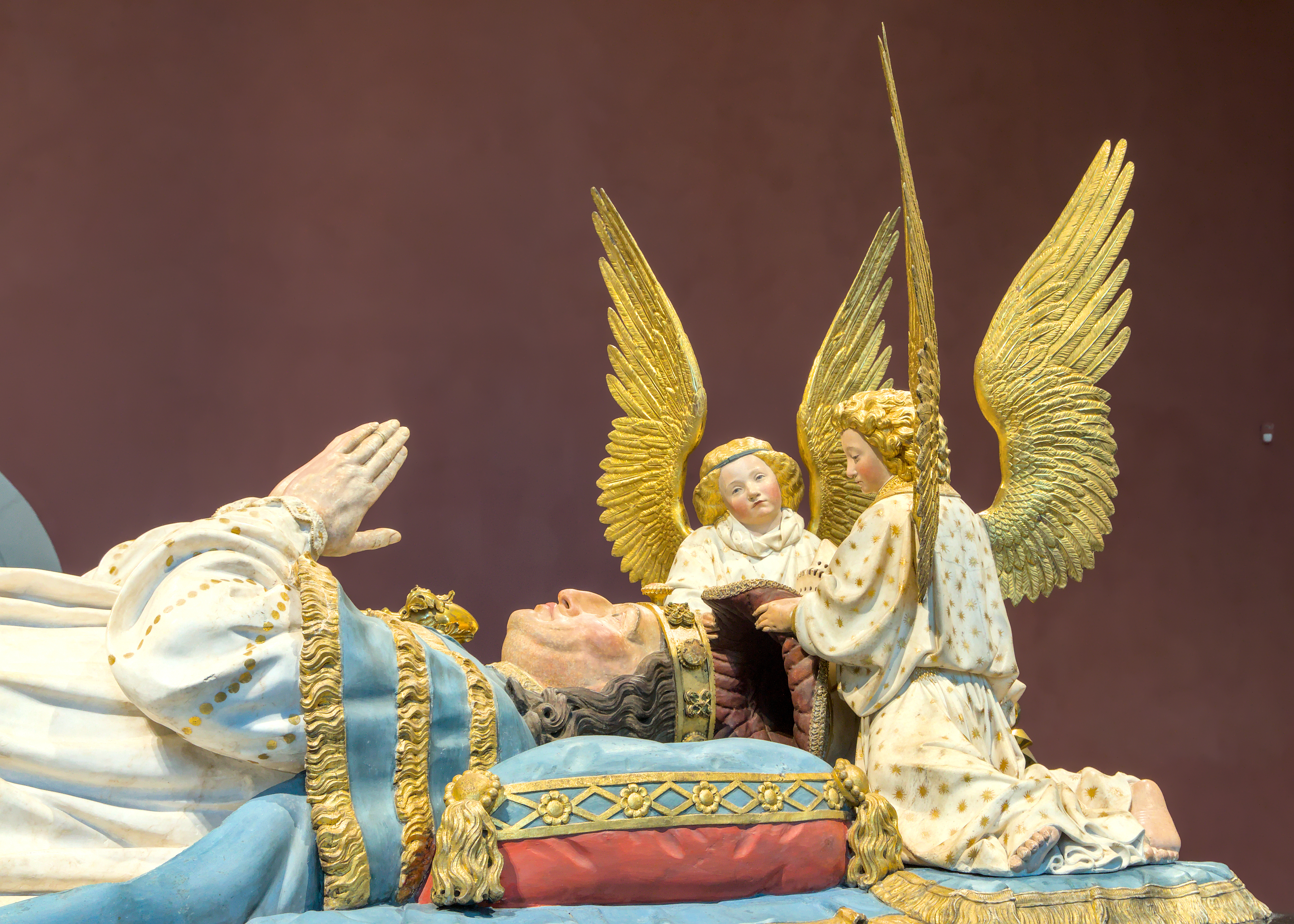
Philip the Bold

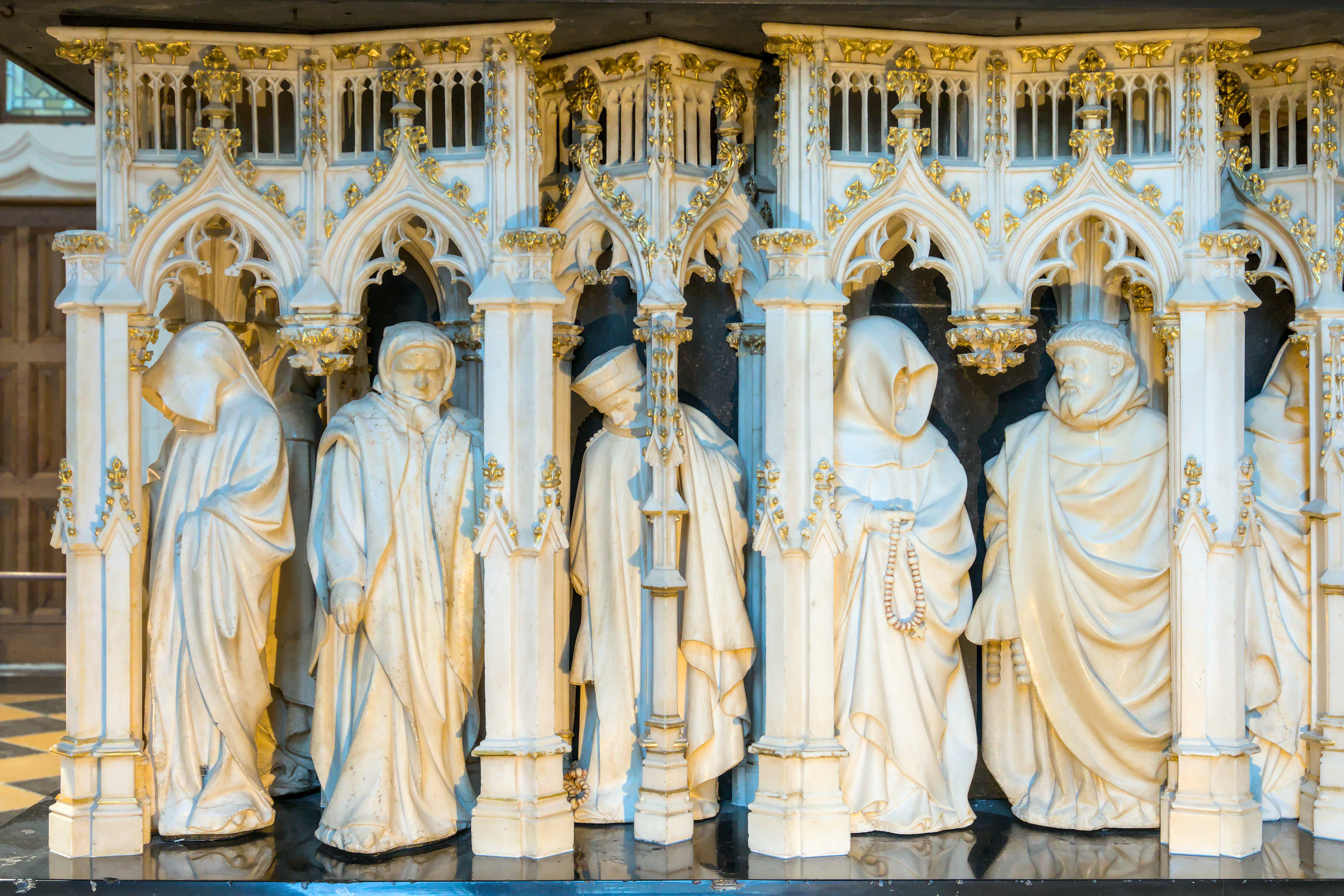
"Pleurants" or mourners below Philip's tomb

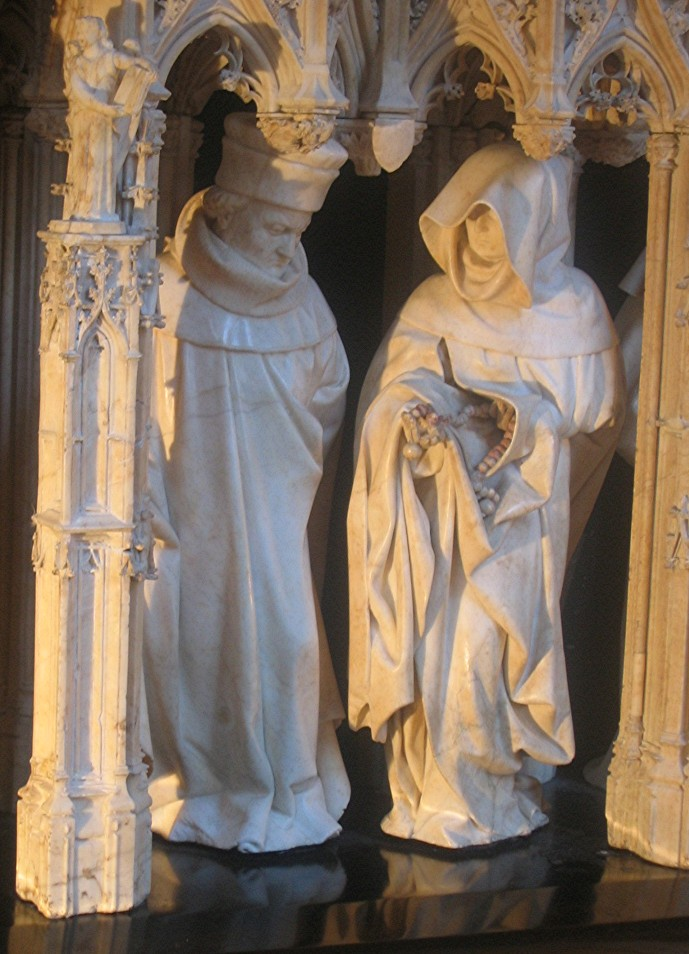
Two of the "pleurants" from the later tomb

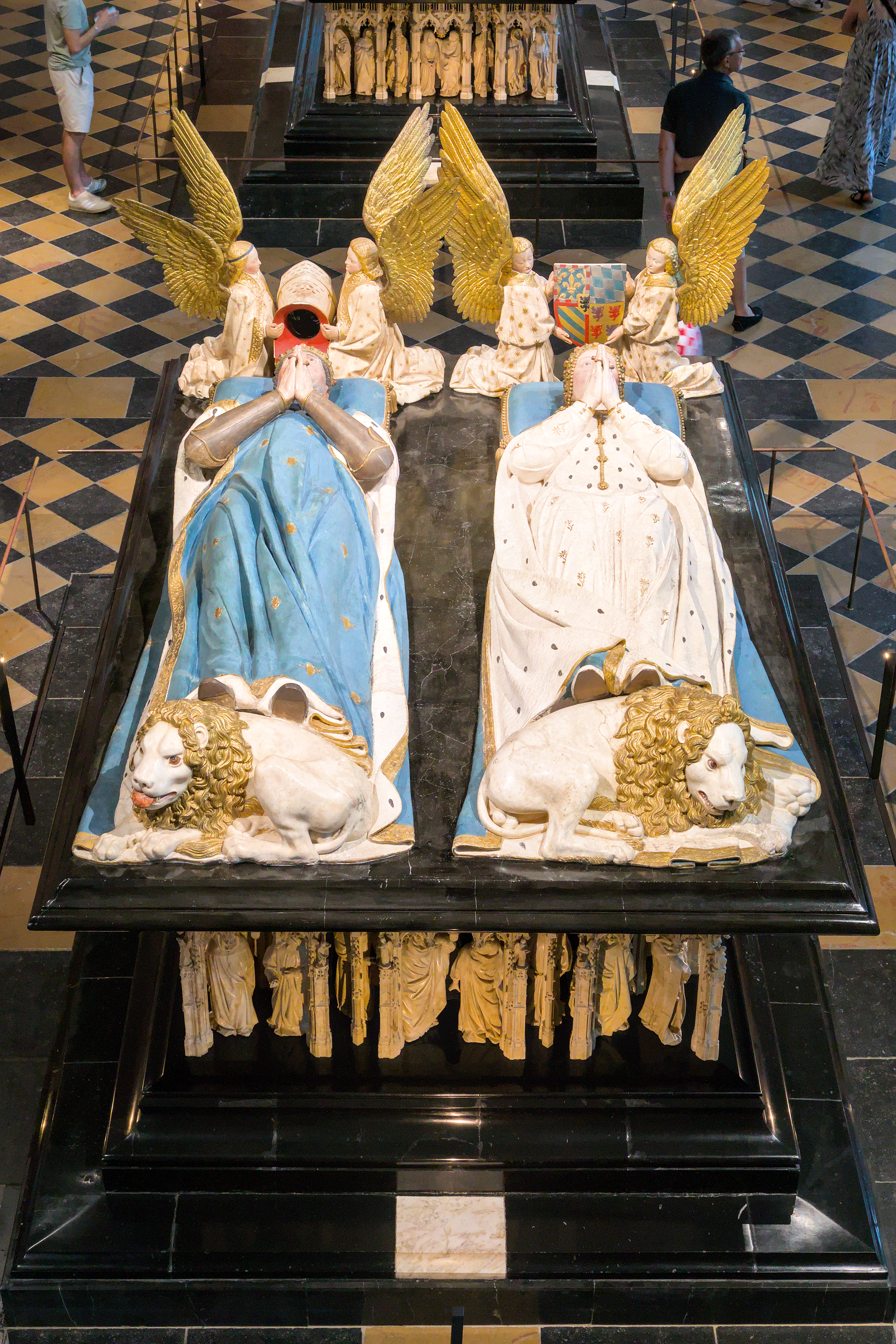
John the Fearless and Margaret of Bavaria

== Works of art from Champmol ==
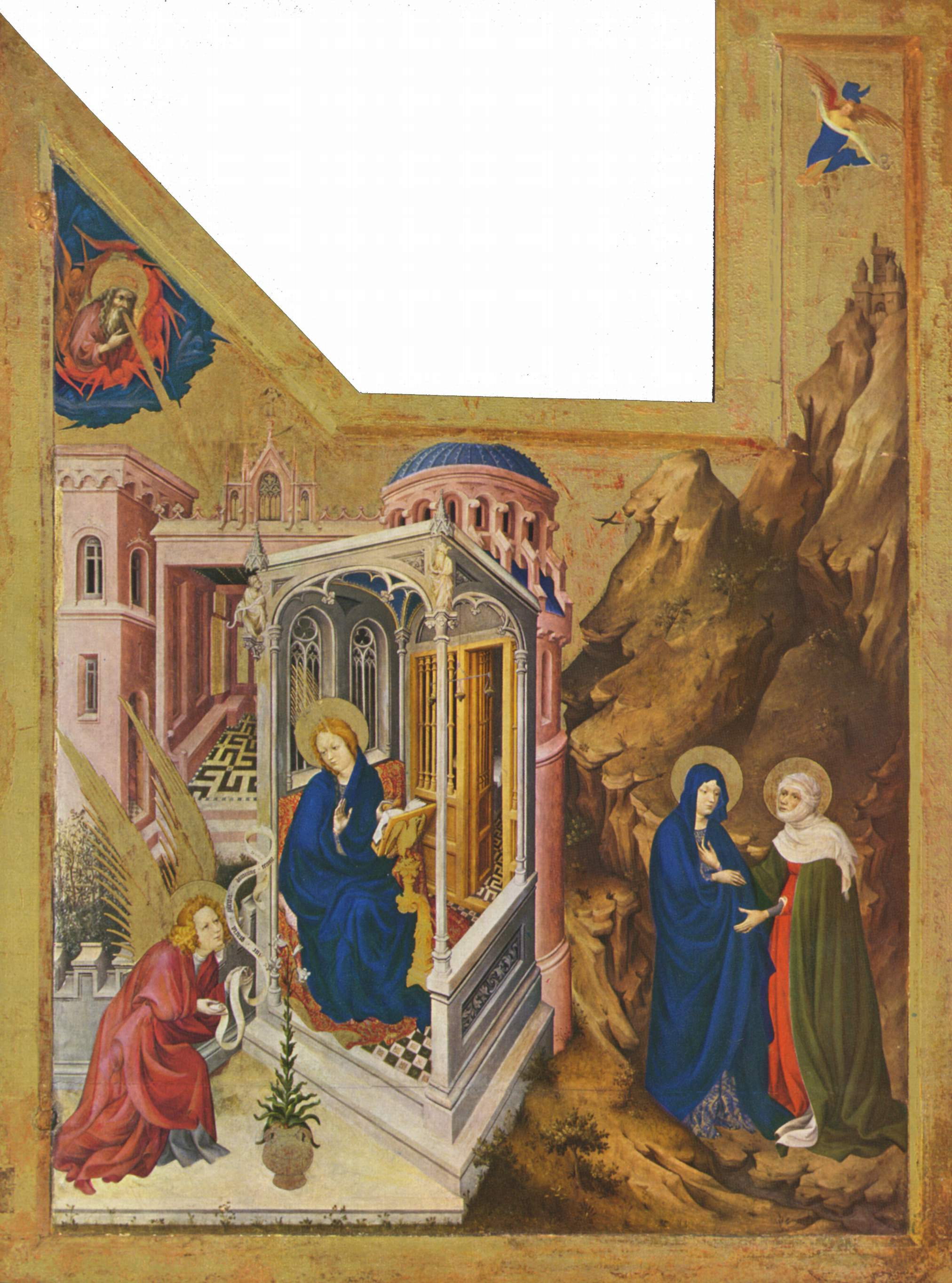
Melchior Broederlam, Annunciation and Visitation (1393–1399), left panel of a pair; (Dijon, Musée des Beaux-Arts)

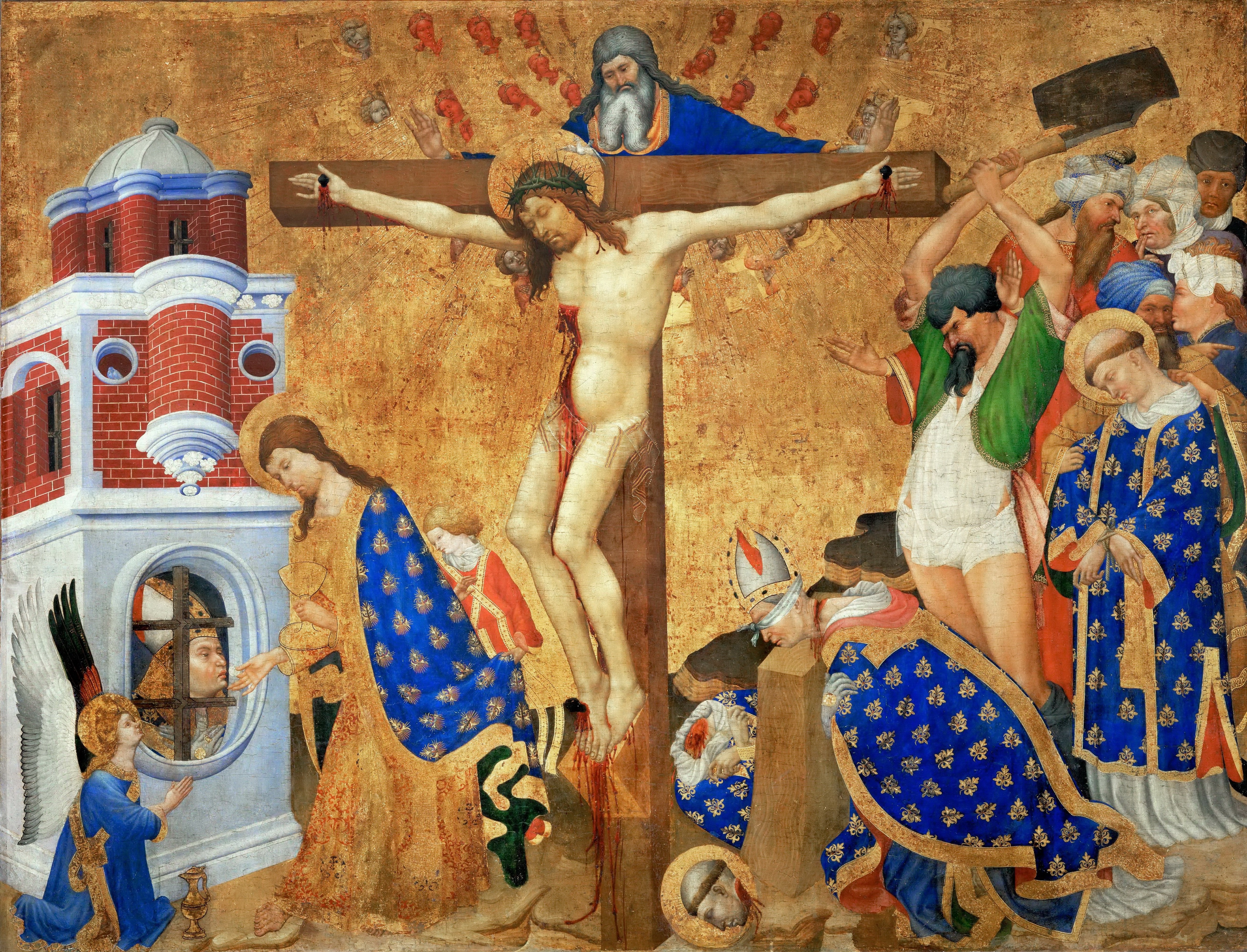
The Last Communion and Martyrdom of Saint Denis, by Henri Bellechose, 1416. Louvre

Champmol was designed as a showpiece, and the artistic contents, now dispersed, represent much of the finest monumental work, as opposed to illuminated manuscripts, of French and Burgundian art of the period. Without the works that remained at Champmol until the 18th century, Claus Sluter, Jacques de Baerze, Melchior Broederlam, Henri Bellechose, Jean Malouel, and Jean de Beaumetz would remain only names known from documentary records.

=== Still at Champmol ===
There are very important sculptures by Claus Sluter and his workshop on the church portal, including kneeling figures of Philip and his Duchess. The lower parts of the Well of Moses (Puits de Moise) survive, including six life-size figures of the Old Testament prophets who foretold the Messiah, most of the rest having been destroyed, apparently more by weathering than the Revolution.

=== In Dijon museums ===
Most items are in the Musée des Beaux-Arts, including its site in the former palace of the Dukes. The fragments from the Well of Moses and other similar pieces are in the Archaeological Museum. The following are only the main works in Dijon:

- Two painted and gilded carved wood retables, that are almost the only remaining works by the Flemish sculptor Jacques de Baerze, and also the only complete Netherlandish carved altarpieces before the late 15th century. The outer panels of the larger are the only surviving paintings by Melchior Broederlam, and highly important works for tracing the development of Early Netherlandish painting. Broederlam also painted and gilded the carvings by de Baerze.
- The tombs (in fact always cenotaphs) of the Dukes of Burgundy; the museum has the tombs of Philip the Bold and his son John the Fearless with his wife Margaret of Bavaria. The effigies are 19th-century reconstructions, from old drawings and prints, of the originals which were destroyed in the Revolution. About ten of the "pleurants" are also copies of originals liberated or lost.
- The funerary crown of Philip the Bold, in brass and glass.
- The head and torso of the crucified Christ from the Well of Moses.
- The Retable of Saint George, an early-15th-century painted altarpiece, probably donated by one of the monks, whose donor portrait appears at the foot of the crucified Christ.
- One of the crucifixions from the two hermitages added in 1433.
- Two altarpieces by Charles-André van Loo, which replaced older works (one the Retable of Saint George) in 1741.

=== Elsewhere ===
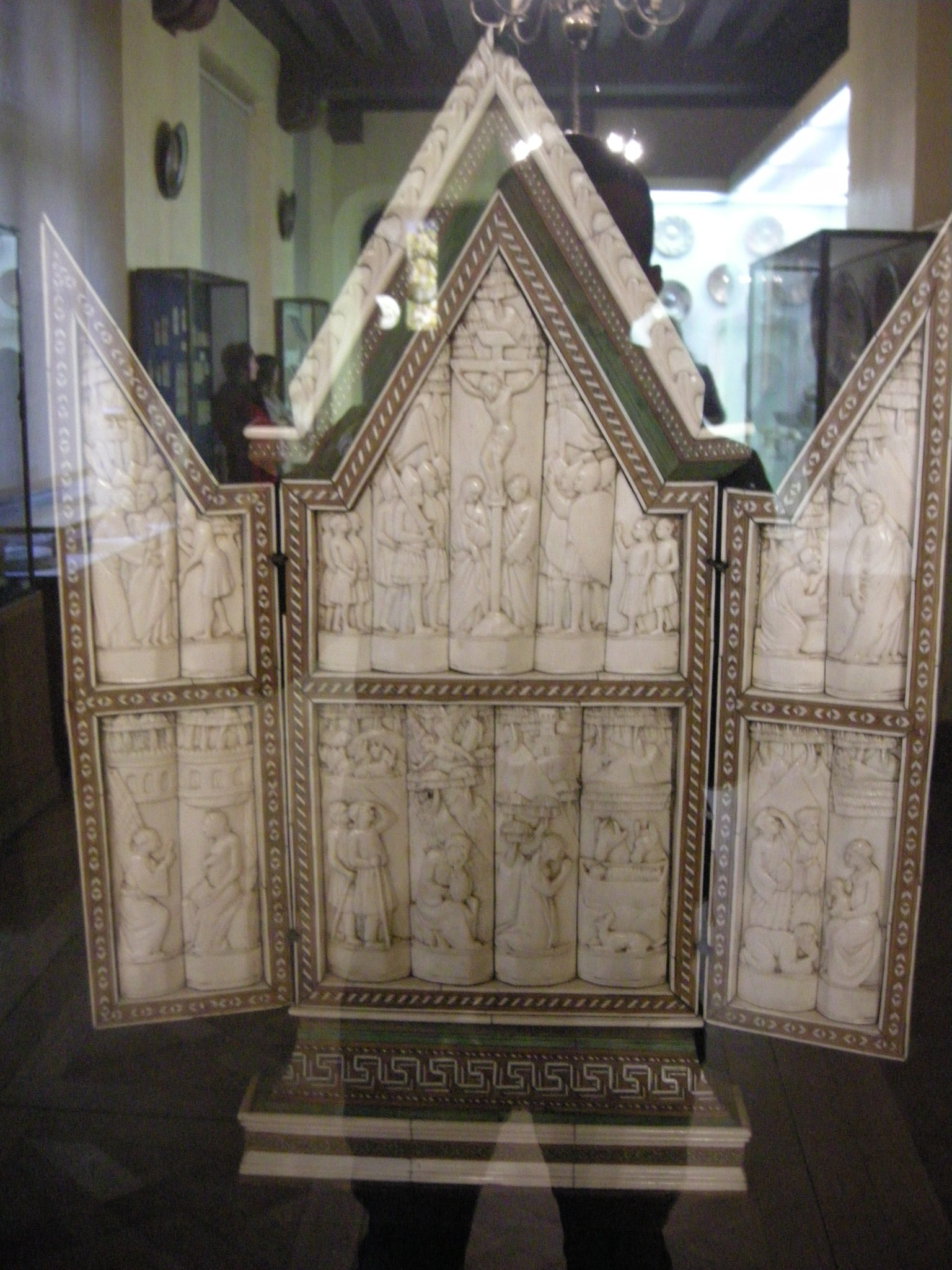
One of the ivory relief triptychs by the Embriachi workshops, 1397

- Louvre, the Martyrdom of Saint Denis by Henri Bellechose, the tondo of the Pietà by Jean Malouel, and one of 24 paintings of the crucifixion for the monks' hermitages by Jean de Beaumetz, all of which are the best known works of each artist.
- Washington, National Gallery of Art, the Annunciation by Jan van Eyck; the two other panels of the triptych recorded at Champmol in 1791 have been lost.
- Gemäldegalerie, Berlin, a large Madonna and Child, only rediscovered in 1960 and now on loan to the Gemäldegalerie, is attributed to Jean Malouel It is believed the Berlin picture was one wing of a diptych for Champmol, opposite a portrait of John the Fearless.
- Cleveland Museum of Art, the only other one of the 24 paintings by Jean de Beaumetz to survive, and four "pleurant" figures from Philip's tomb.
- Baltimore, Walters Art Museum, half of the "Antwerp-Baltimore Polyptych" c. 1400.
- Antwerp, the other three scenes of the "Antwerp-Baltimore Polyptych"
- Musée de Cluny, Paris, two bone and ivory relief triptychs by the leading Italian Embriachi workshop, donated by Duke Philip in 1393.
- Chicago (Art Institute of Chicago), the figure from a gilded and painted wood crucifix by de Baerze and Broederlam.

=== Gallery ===
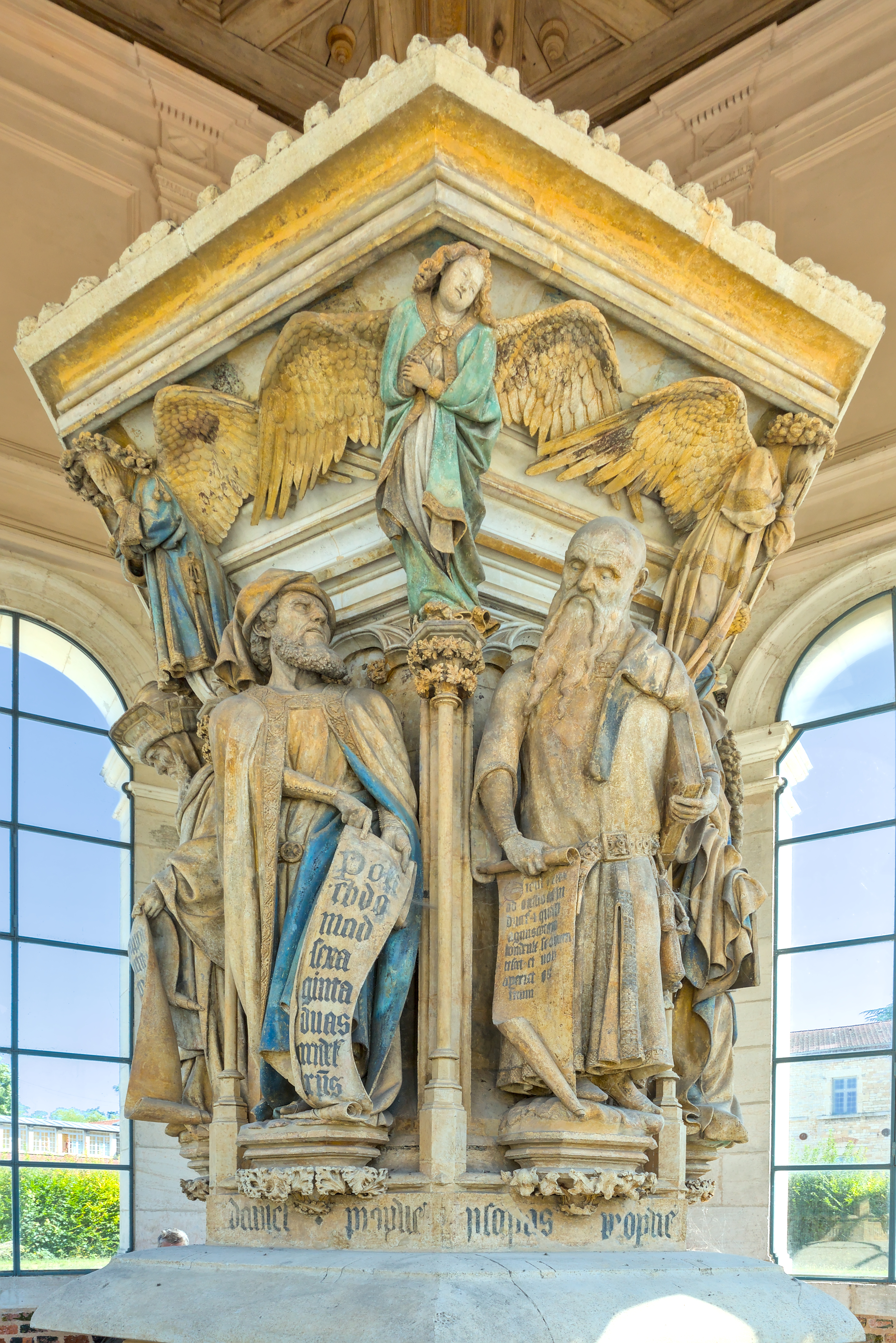
The base of the Well of Moses shows the prophets who foretold the coming of Christ

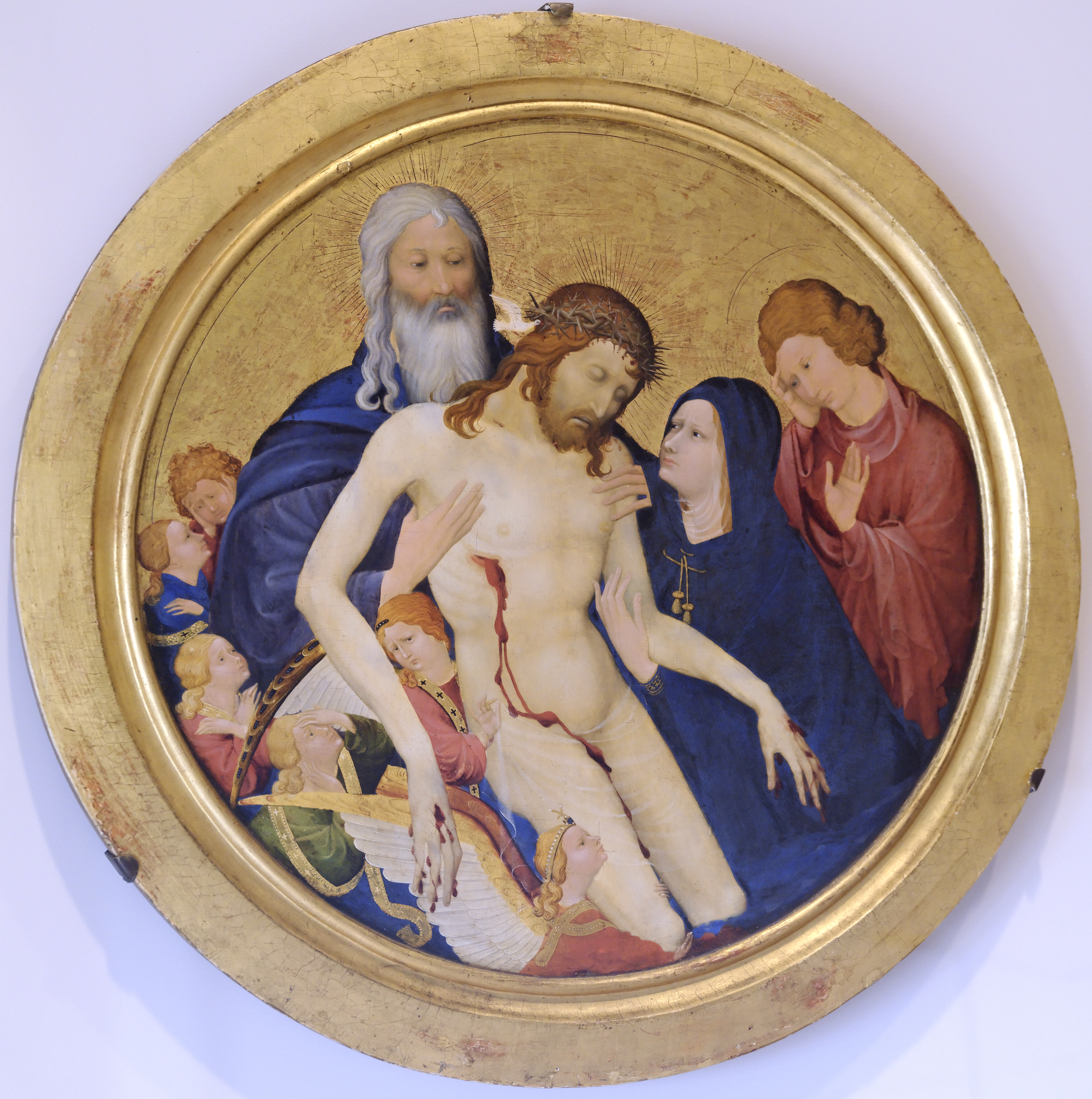
Pietà by Jean Malouel, Philip's court painter, Louvre, 1400–15

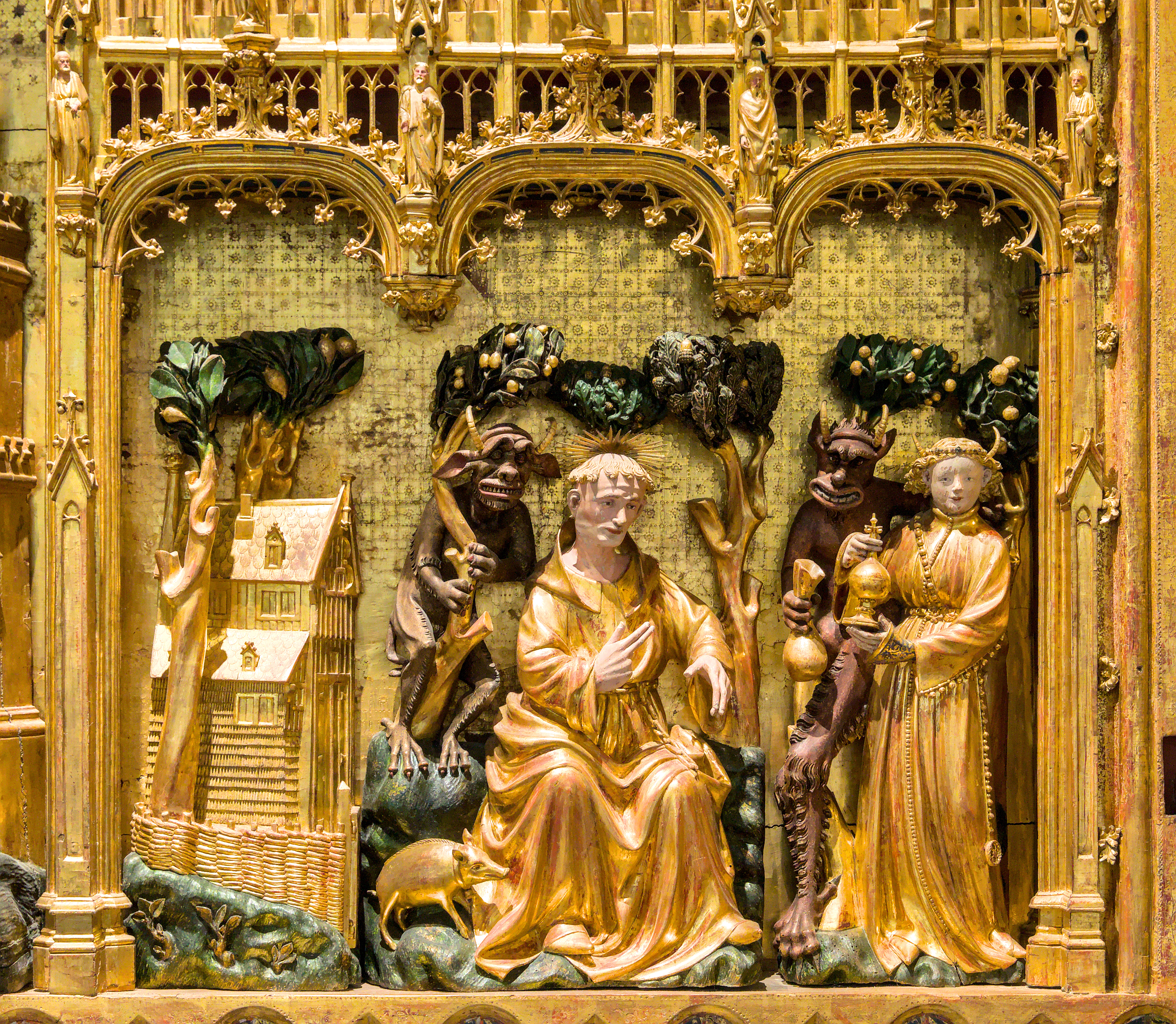
Scene from a retable by Jacques de Baerze, Dijon.

Annunciation by Jan van Eyck, from around 1434–1436, Washington.

== Later history ==
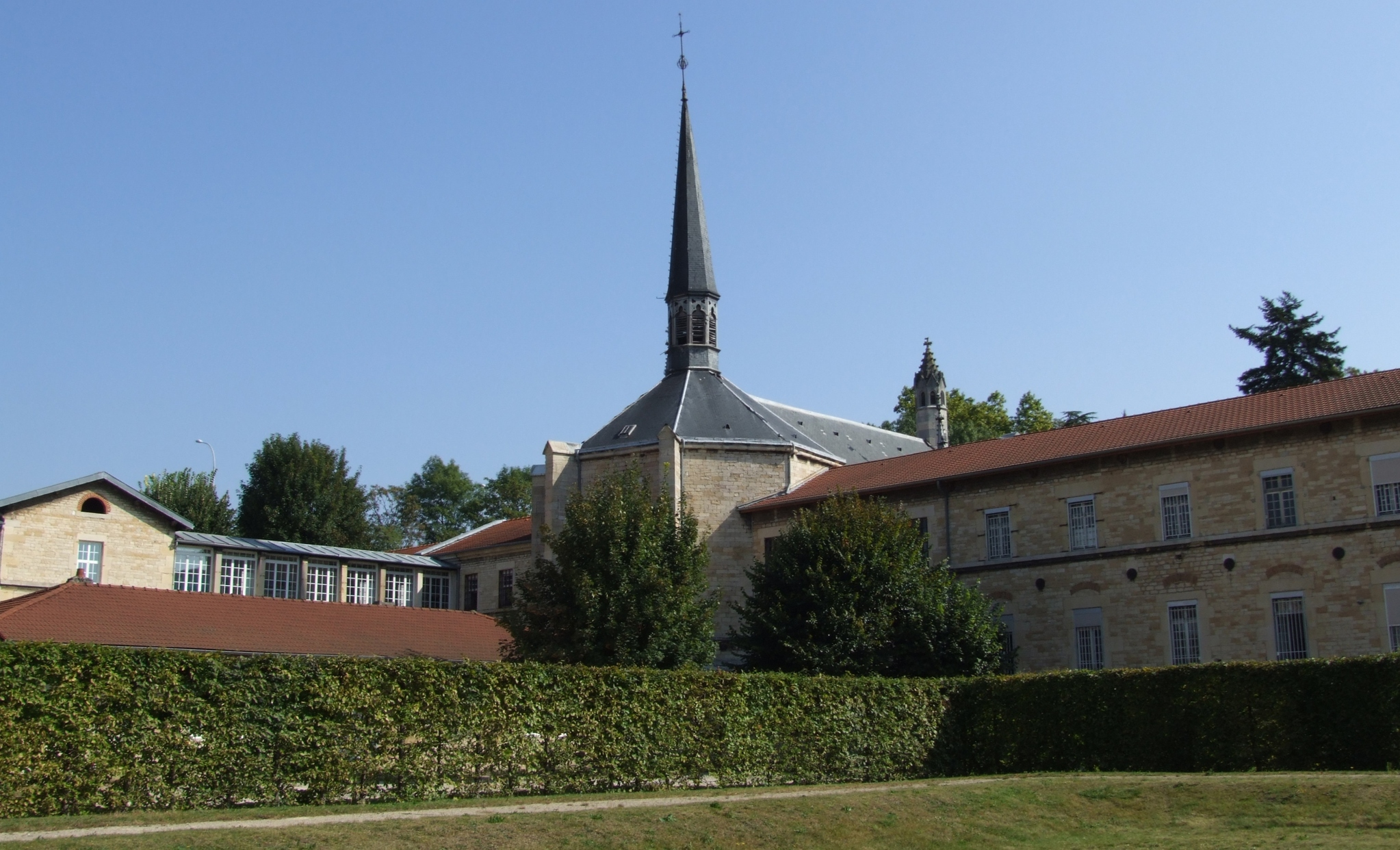
The monastery today, with the truncated church.

After the death in 1477 of Charles the Bold, Burgundy proper was recovered by force by France; the Kings, still descended from the Dukes via the Habsburgs and other routes, continued to support and occasionally visit the monastery. There was slight damage in the siege of Dijon in 1513 and in the French Wars of Religion, but essentially the monastery remained in its 15th-century state until it was decided to update it in the 1770s. The altarpieces of Saints Denis and George had been replaced by new paintings by Charles-André van Loo in 1741; both the new paintings are now in the Dijon museum. Remodelling in the 1770s involved the destruction of some medieval parts, but greater destruction followed the French Revolution. The monastery was suppressed in 1791, and on May 4, five days after the monks departed, the buildings and land were bought by Emmanuel Crétet (1747–1808), later to be Minister of the Interior under Napoleon with the title Comte de Champmol. He destroyed large parts of the buildings and the church. In 1833 the estate was bought by the local département as a mental asylum, and many new buildings erected.

Today the buildings house a psychiatric hospital, and "aller à la chartreuse" is a local phrase for developing a mental disorder. The Sluter sculptures can be seen by visitors, and many of the contents are in the Dijon museum, with the tombs and carved retables housed in the former Palace of the Dukes.
