= Melchior Broederlam =

Early Netherlandish painter

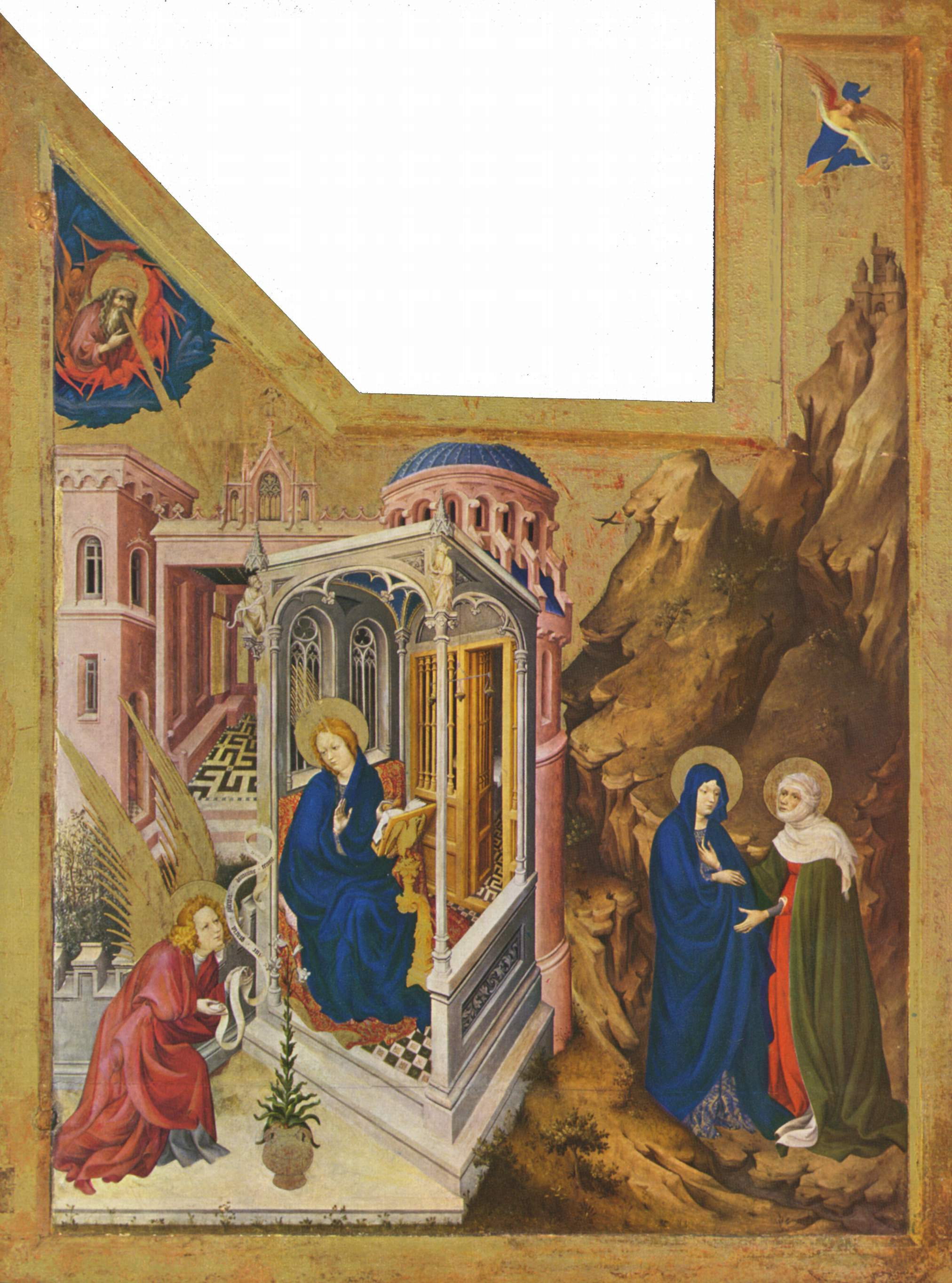
Melchior Broederlam, Annunciation and Visitation (1393–1399), left panel of a pair; (Dijon, Musée des Beaux-Arts)

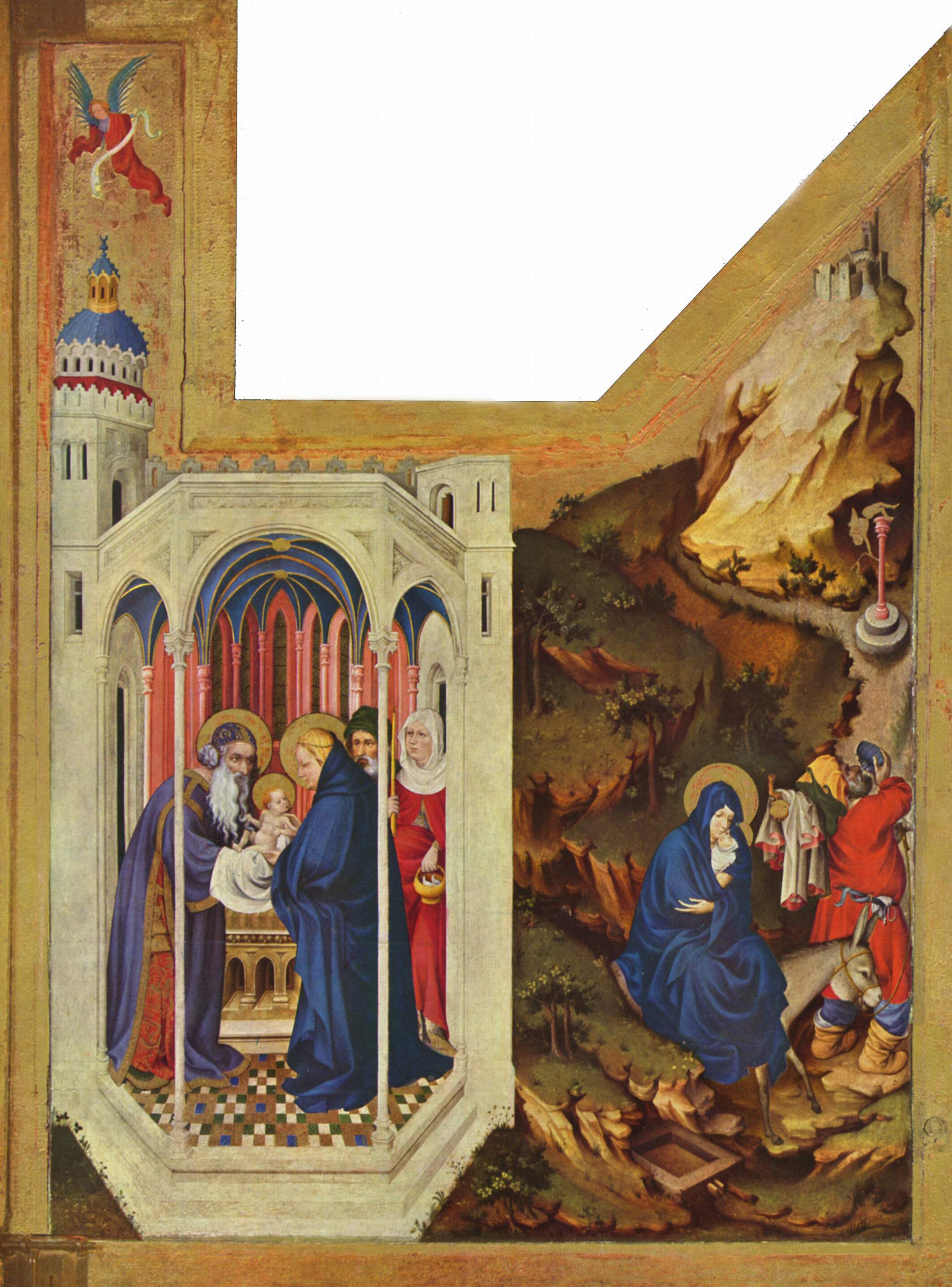
The right panel: Presentation of Jesus and the Flight into Egypt. Each panel, including the frame, is 167cm high and 125cm wide.

Melchior Broederlam (born Ypres, perhaps c. 1350; died Ypres?, after 1409) was one of the earliest Early Netherlandish painters to whom surviving works can be confidently attributed. He worked mostly for Philip the Bold, Duke of Burgundy, and is documented from 1381 to 1409. Although only a single large pair of panel paintings can confidently be attributed to him, no history of Western painting can neglect his contribution.

== Life ==
His early career included a lengthy stay in Italy, where he adopted a sense of space and use of modelling influenced by Trecento painting. From 1381 he was court painter to Louis de Mâle, Duke of Brabant, and from Louis's death in 1384 worked for his son-in-law and successor, Philip the Bold, although he remained based in Ypres, doing much work, mostly decorative, at Philip's now vanished chateau at Hesdin, which was full of elaborate mechanical devices, of what we might today call a fairground nature, which needed painting. Like many court artists, including Jan van Eyck, he was appointed valet de chambre to the Duke (in 1387), and in 1391 promoted to court painter. He continued to work for Philip's successor John the Fearless, but last appears in the Ducal accounts in 1409.

== Dijon panels ==
Probably his only surviving paintings (as opposed to painted carvings) are the two outsides of the wings for a well-documented carved altarpiece, the Crucifixion Altarpiece, by Jacques de Baerze, commissioned by Philip for the charterhouse of Champmol near Dijon, which Broederlam completed in 1399, also gilding and painting the wood carvings inside. This is now in the Musée des Beaux-Arts de Dijon, as is another altarpiece from the same commission, for which he gilded and painted the carved figures; he had apparently also painted outside panels for this, but they are lost. Guild rules usually mandated that carving and painting were performed by members of different guilds.

Broederlam's use of oil paint had a strong impact on the painters of the following generation, including Robert Campin and Jan van Eyck. Both panels include two scenes, with an extensive landscape, and look into pavilion-like buildings in a manner derived from Italy. Although the perspective is far from fully developed, light and shadow are used to create a sense of depth in a very advanced fashion, and the realistic depiction of Saint Joseph was to become characteristic of Netherlandish painting. Although the skies are painted in gold in the Dijon panels, a flying hawk in one shows they are intended as real space. The buildings in the Annunciation combine Romanesque and Gothic areas, probably intended to contrast the Old and New Testaments, in a visual metaphor that was to become characteristic of Eyckian painting. The panels contain much of the contemporary International Gothic but also "announce a new world of naturalism and disguised symbolism that will be further refined in the works of his successors in the Netherlands."

== Possible other works ==
Some other works have been attributed to him or his workshop, but without being generally accepted. In particular six scenes (two panels are painted on both sides) from an altarpiece from Champmol, now equally divided between Antwerp and Baltimore, have often been attributed to him, although iconographic and stylistic details suggest a Mosan origin.
