= Tomb of Philip the Bold =

Funerary monument

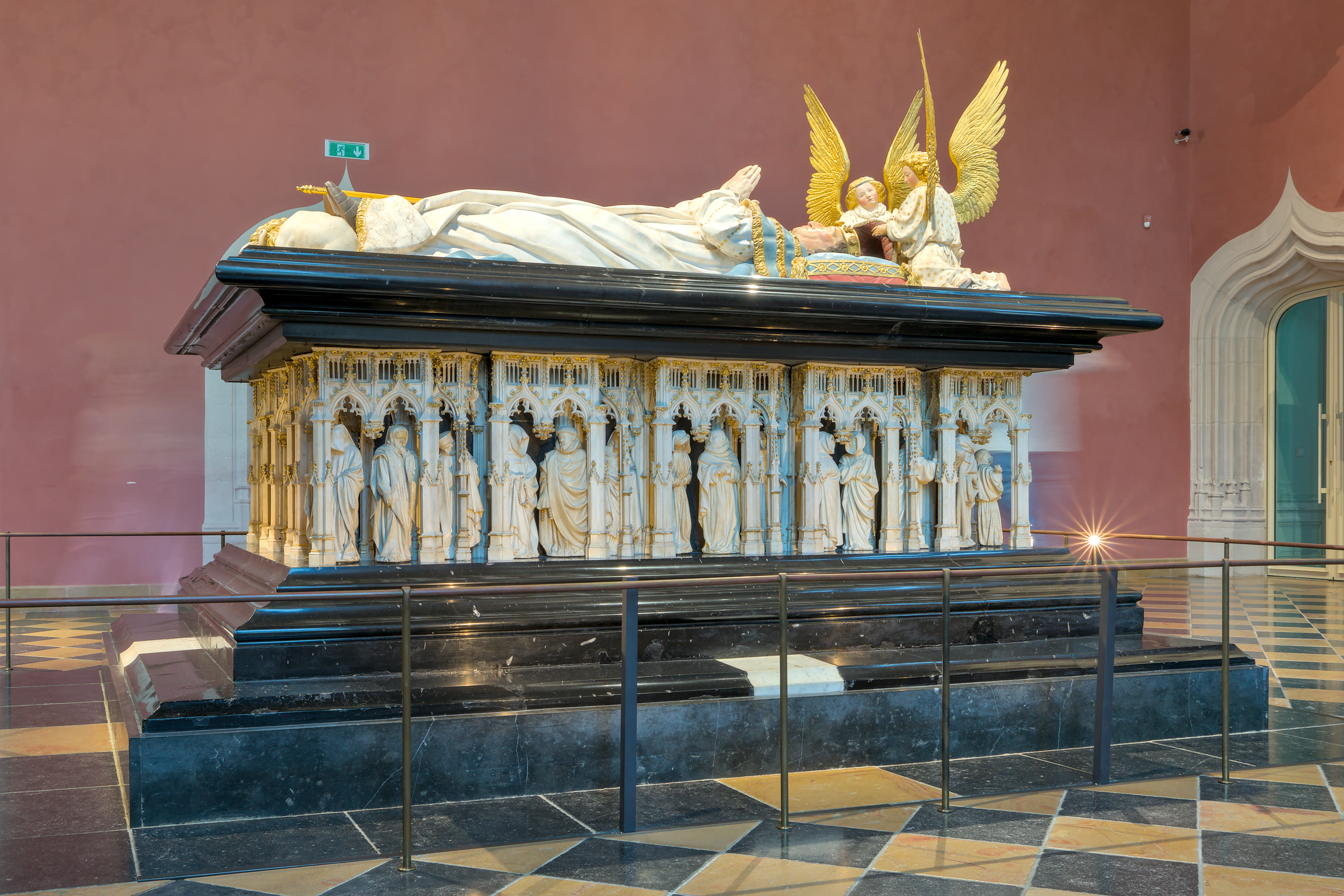
Tomb of Philip the Bold. Built between 1384 and 1410 by the workshops of Jean de Marville, Claus Sluter and Claus de Werve from Italian and Diant black marble, gilded alabaster, and polychrome. H: 24 3cm (7 ft 11.75 in)

The Tomb of Philip the Bold is a funerary monument commissioned in 1378 by the Duke of Burgundy Philip the Bold (d. 1404) for his burial at the Chartreuse de Champmol, the Carthusian monastery he built on the outskirts of Dijon, in today's France. The construction was overseen by Jean de Marville, who designed the tomb and oversaw the building of the charterhouse. Marville worked on the tomb from 1384, but progressed slowly until his death in 1389. That year Claus Sluter took over design of Champmol, including the tomb. Philip died in 1404 with his funerary monument still incomplete. After Sluter's death c. 1405/06, his nephew Claus de Werve was hired to complete the project, which he finished in 1410.

The monument shows the duke recumbent on a black marble slab with his eyes open, his hands clasped, and his helmet held by two angels as a lion rests at his feet. Below him, positioned in alternating double archways and triangular niches, pleurants (mourning figures) walk as if part of a funeral procession. The figures were designed by Sluter and became widely influential in the following decades. Philip's son, John the Fearless (d. 1419) commissioned a similar tomb and set of figures for both himself and his wife, Margaret of Bavaria.

The monuments were not completed and installed until 1470, however pleurants designed for them surpassed those in Philip's tomb and are arguably better known today. Jean, Duke of Berry (d. 1416) commissioned a similar work for his burial, and later again Sluter's work on Philip's tomb inspired the well known Mourners of Dijon, crafted a generation later.

Today both Philip and John's tombs are housed in the Musée des Beaux-Arts de Dijon.

== Commission and attribution ==
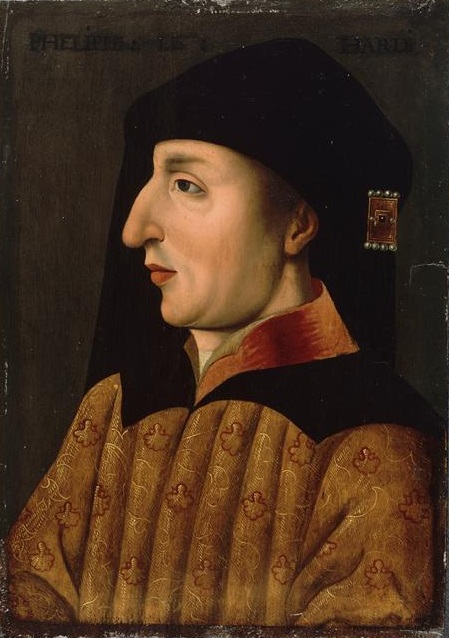
Portrait of Philip the Bold, unknown artist. 16th century, Hospice Comtesse, Lille

Philip acquired the domain of Champmol, on the west outskirts of Dijon, in 1378 to build the Carthusian monastery Chartreuse de Champmol as the site of his and his predecessors' tombs. Although he held little personal regard for the clergy and was never keen to fund them, by the early 1390s he was under significant financial pressure to do so. In addition, he was fond of ceremony and commissioned the charterhouse to display his religious devotion and to create an appropriately ambitious sanctified place for the resting places of his dynasty. Via Philip's investment, and the quality of successive artists he employed for the project, Champmol is today regarded as one of the great artistic achievements of the Middle Ages. Although Philip spent much of his time in Paris, Dijon had been home to the Dukes of Burgundy from the early 11th to the late 15th centuries, and he wished Champmol to become its ducal palace. Its cornerstone was laid in 1383, and its foundational charter is dated 1385. Champmol was dedicated to the Virgin and the Trinity in 1388, and that year the first monks took up residence. However the charterhouse took in total over 20 years to complete and despite great expense was not finalised until Philip's tomb was installed in 1410.

In 1380, Philip commissioned Jean de Marville to make an alabaster sepulcher for him in Dijon, and in 1386 asked to eventually be buried in the choir. De Marville began to work on the tomb in 1384, employing a number of artisans to cut and shape the alabaster for the arcades. The following year he purchased one large and several smaller blocks of black Dinant marble.

By 1384 de Marville had a workforce of around 10 craftsmen, all of whom had progressed beyond apprenticeship and were masters. Historical records show that by 1386 he had at least thirteen fully qualified craftsmen, including two specialist polishers brought in from Paris. Work proceeded slowly, and by the Duke's death in 1404, only two mourners and the framework were complete. Philip's son John the Fearless, assumed control of the project and gave Sluter, who had been Philip's chief sculptor since 1389, four years to finish the tomb, but the artist died within two years. Sluter's nephew and assistant, Claus de Werve took over and finished the sculptures in 1410. By 1387, the arcade around the base was largely complete and assembled.

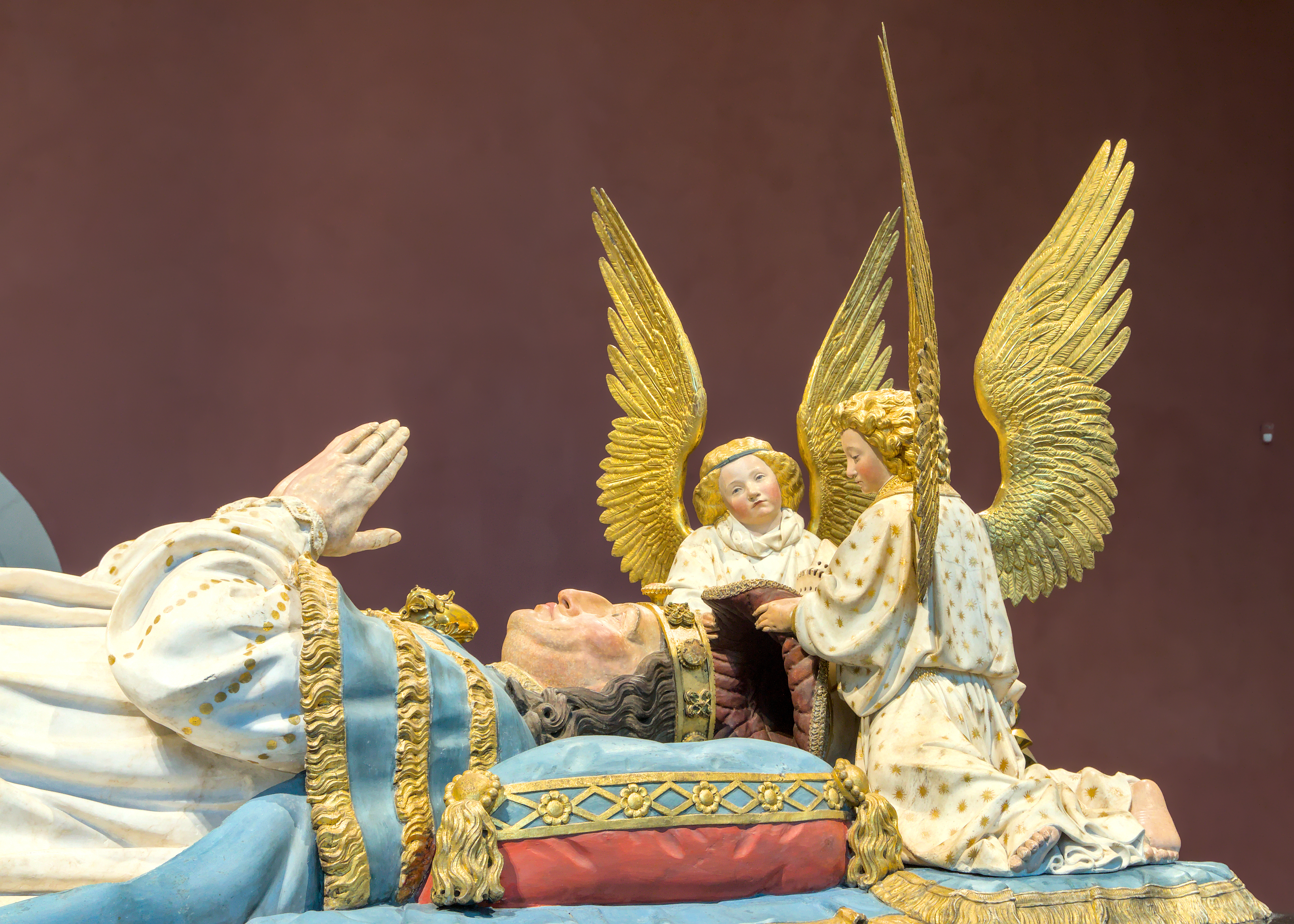
Detail of Philip's death mask and angel wings

The polychrome effigies were painted by Jean Maelwael.

Van Eram's main contribution was in adding to outlines of the capitals above the mourners. Sluter designed the mourners themselves, the cherubs above them, and the detail in the arches of the niches. By then the work seems to have been under Sluter's ownership since 1397, and the preparatory work was brought to Champmol, in Paris, where the final masonry work began. Reflecting the fact that the designated area would never have been large enough to contain the number of tombs that Philip had envisioned, in 1402 the monument had become so large that Sluter was forced to break through the wall around the designated area.

Philip's wife Margaret III, Countess of Flanders died in 1405, but had stipulated that her remains would be laid with those of her parents in Lille.

Philip was buried in a cellar beneath the choir on 16 June 1404 (although his organs remained at the church of Saint Martin at Halle, where he died, and his heart was sent to Saint-Denis near Paris, to join the royal tombs present there). In 1792, his body was re-interred at Dijon Cathedral. The following year Champmol was destroyed and the tomb was damaged by revolutionaries and looters. It was restored in the first half of the 19th century.

== Description ==
=== Slab and effigy ===
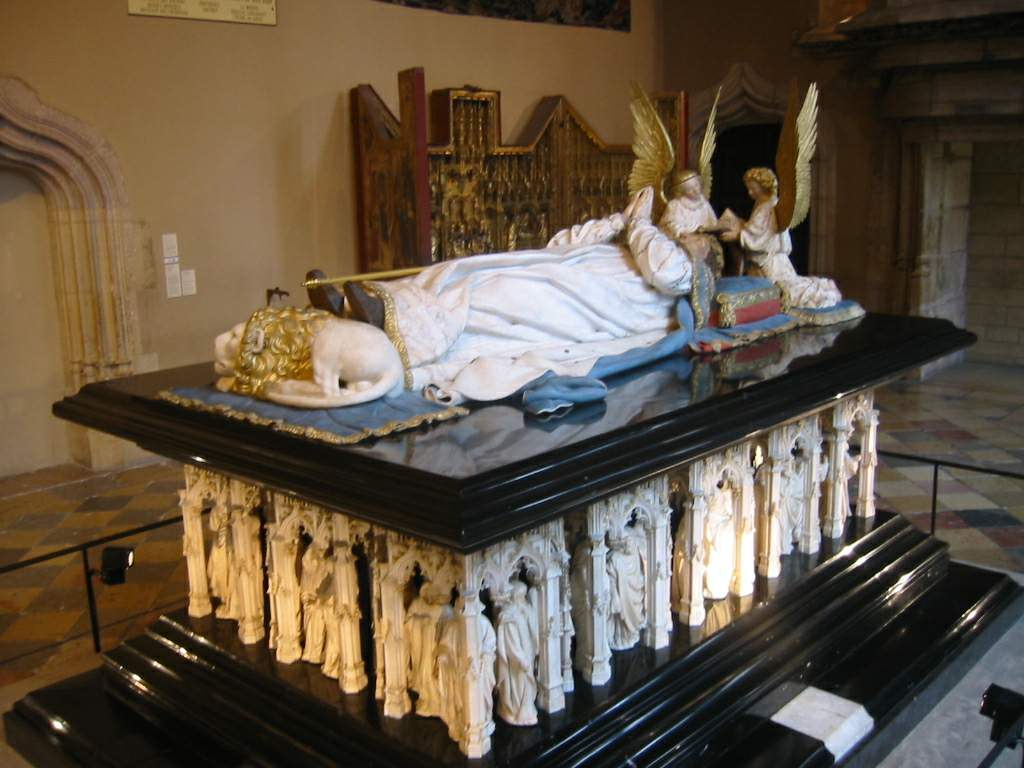
Effigy of Philip the Bold

The monument is made from alabaster, marble, gilt and paint. The upper reliefs contain Philip's sarcophagus effigy, set against highly polished back Tournai stone, purchased by Sluter in 1391. Philip is shown in repose, with his eyes open and his hands upright and clasped in prayer. An angel with gilded wings holds a cushion, formed from a black marble slab, under his head. A lion rests at his feet. The silver plate with painted bright red overtones helmet was probably designed by de Werve and finished by Sluter. The emphasis on the mourning figures indicates that Philip was more concerned with the loss to his reign rather than his physical and spiritual transience.

The extensive inscriptions on the sides of the slabs record his name, position and date of death: "VERY NOBLE AND POWERFUL PRINCE AND FOUNDER OF THIS CHURCH...WHO PASSED AWAY AT HALLE IN BRABANT ON THE XXVIITH DAY OF APRIL, YEAR OF OUR LORD ONE THOUSAND FOUR HUNDRED AND FOUR". Philip's effigy was destroyed by Napoleonic troops in 1793, but recreated in 1825 based on portrait prints. Of the original parts of his effigy, only the hands remain intact.

=== Mourners ===
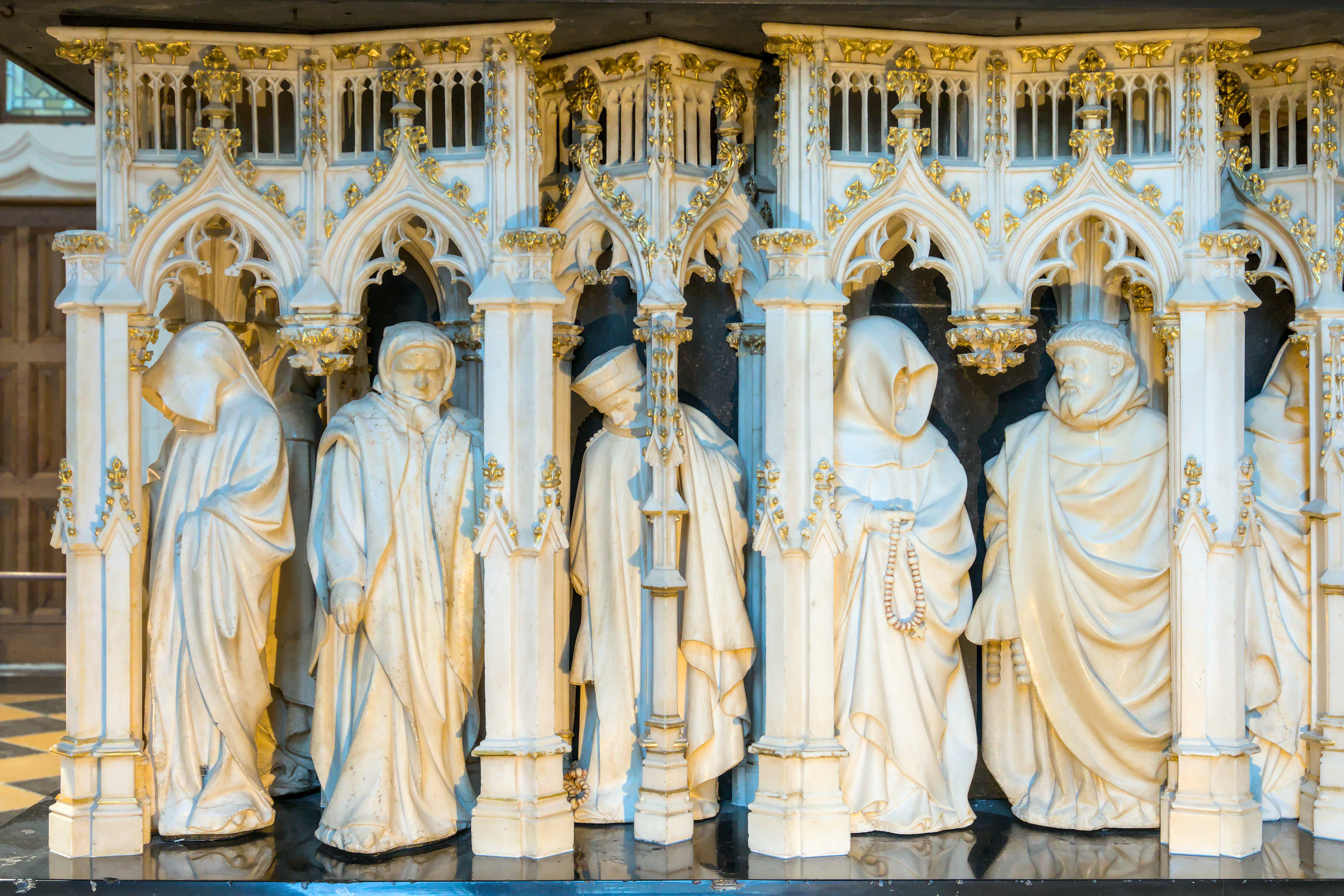
Mourners

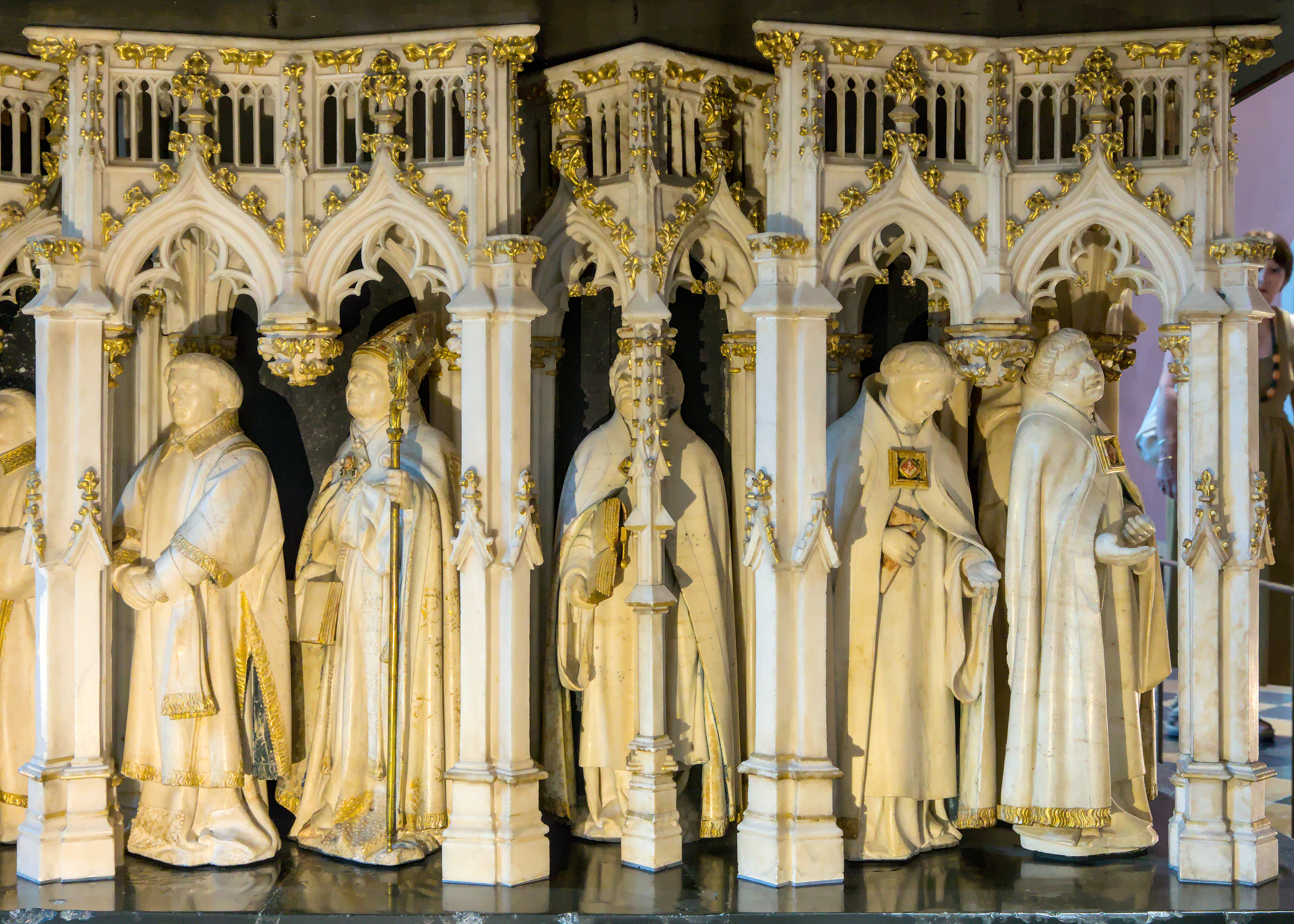
Mourners

The pleurants (or "mourners", the word translates in English to "weepers") are regarded by art historians as by far the most interesting aspect of the tomb, and among Claus Sluter's finest work. A total of 40 figures, measuring between 39 and 42 cm in height, stand in pairs within the elaborate Gothic niches below the slab, arranged as if in procession. Their presence serves to illustrate the grieving of the living, rather than emphasise Philip's physical transience. When Philip was being returned to Dijon following his death in Halle, a group of around 100 paupers were paid to wear mourning cloaks and greet his body outside the city.

The mourners are grouped in a procession of one or two figures, led by a priest and two choirboys carrying holy water, an acolyte, a deacon and bishop, three cantors and two Carthusian monks. Behind these clerics are members of Philip's family and close members of his court. Although each mourner is given an individualised face, none can be considered as portraits of actual courtiers. According to the art historian Jeffrey Chipps Smith, de Marville and Sluter placed them on an elevated black marble platform so that their mourning features would be more visible.

Three pleurants were lost when Champmol was plundered by Napoleonic troops in 1793. The others were returned in the following century from either the French state or private collections. Of the three, two (mourners 18 and 35) are long assumed to have been lost, while mourner 17 is thought to have survived in a private collection. In the original arrangement, angels were placed at either side of the arcade.

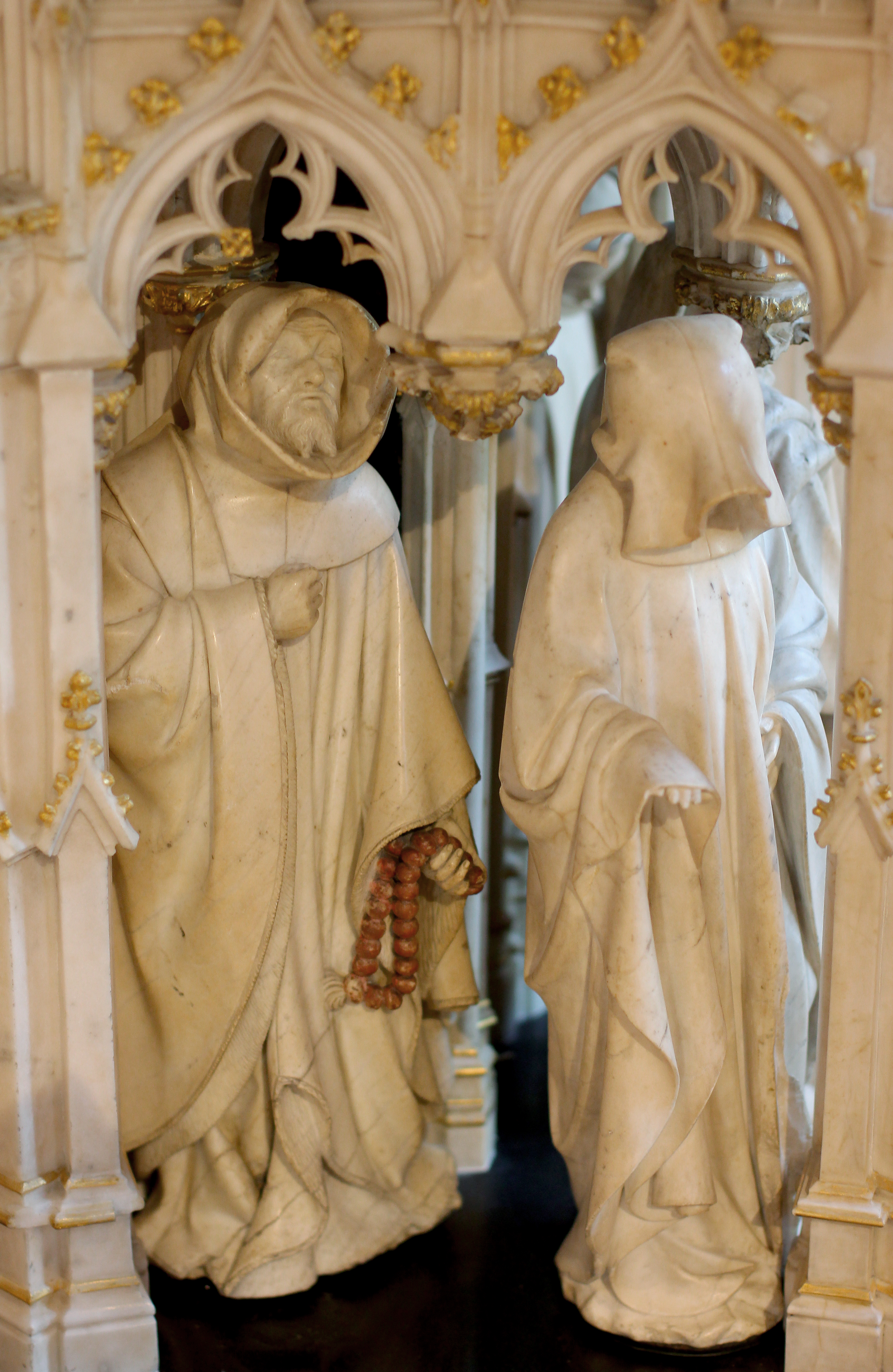

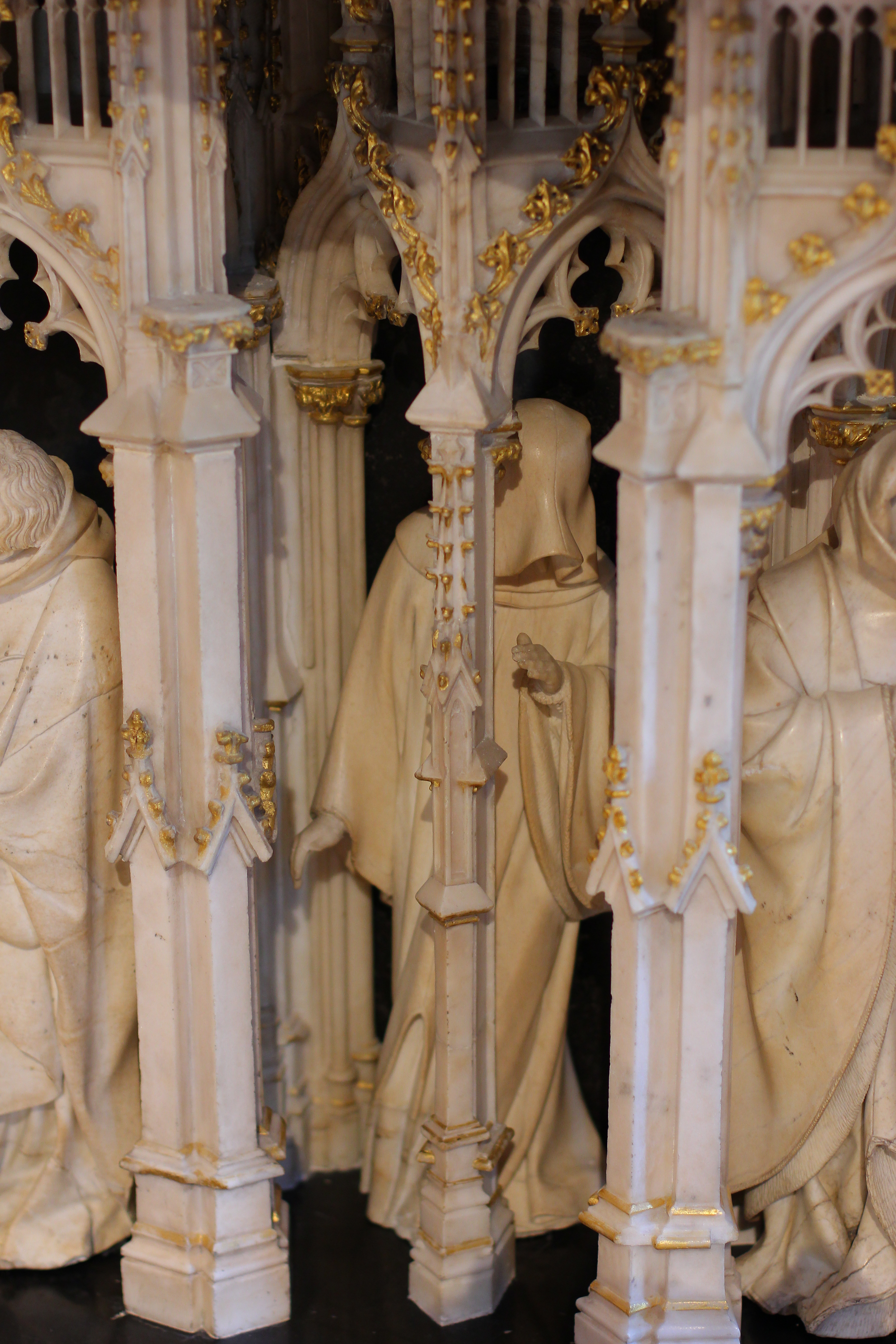

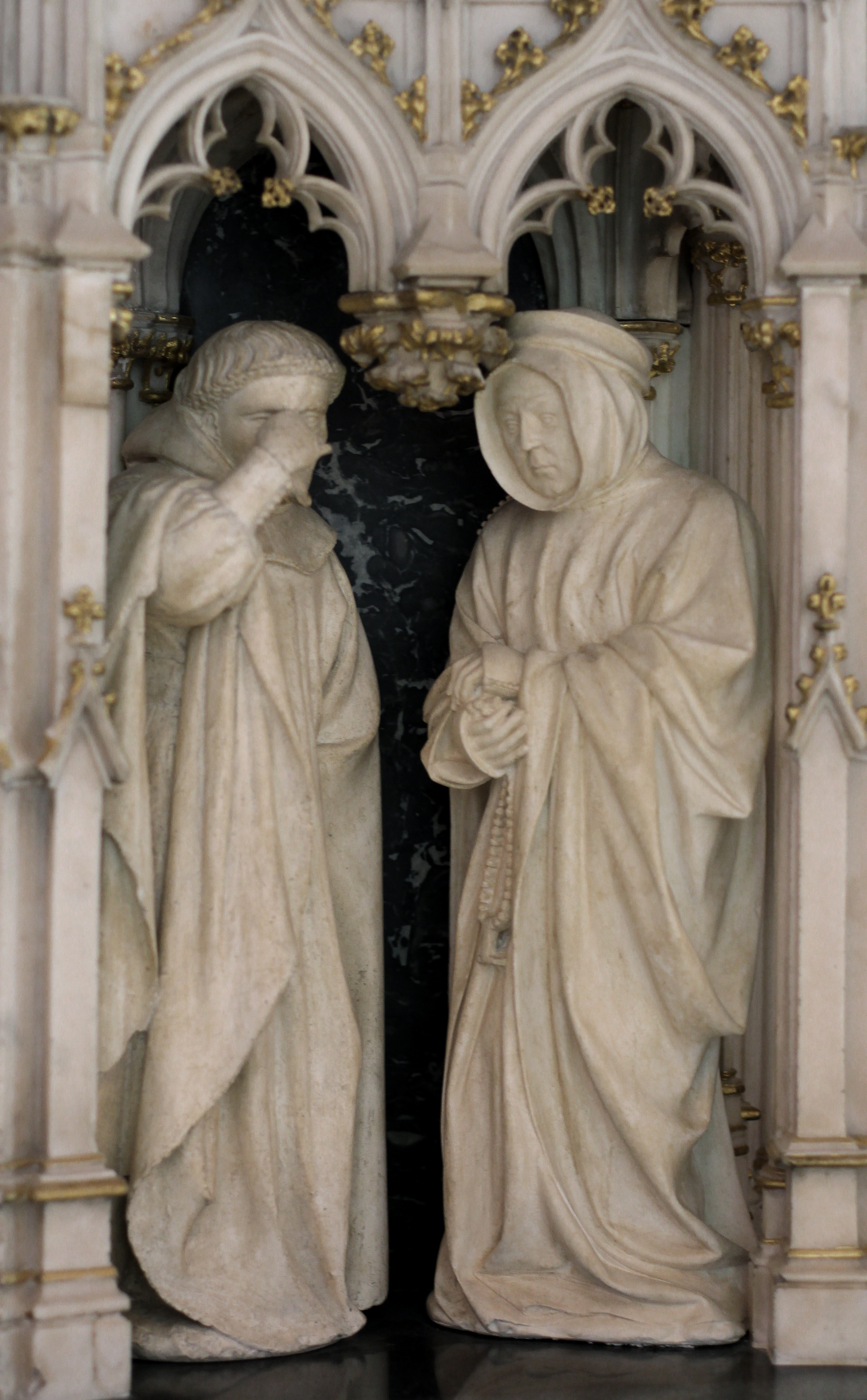

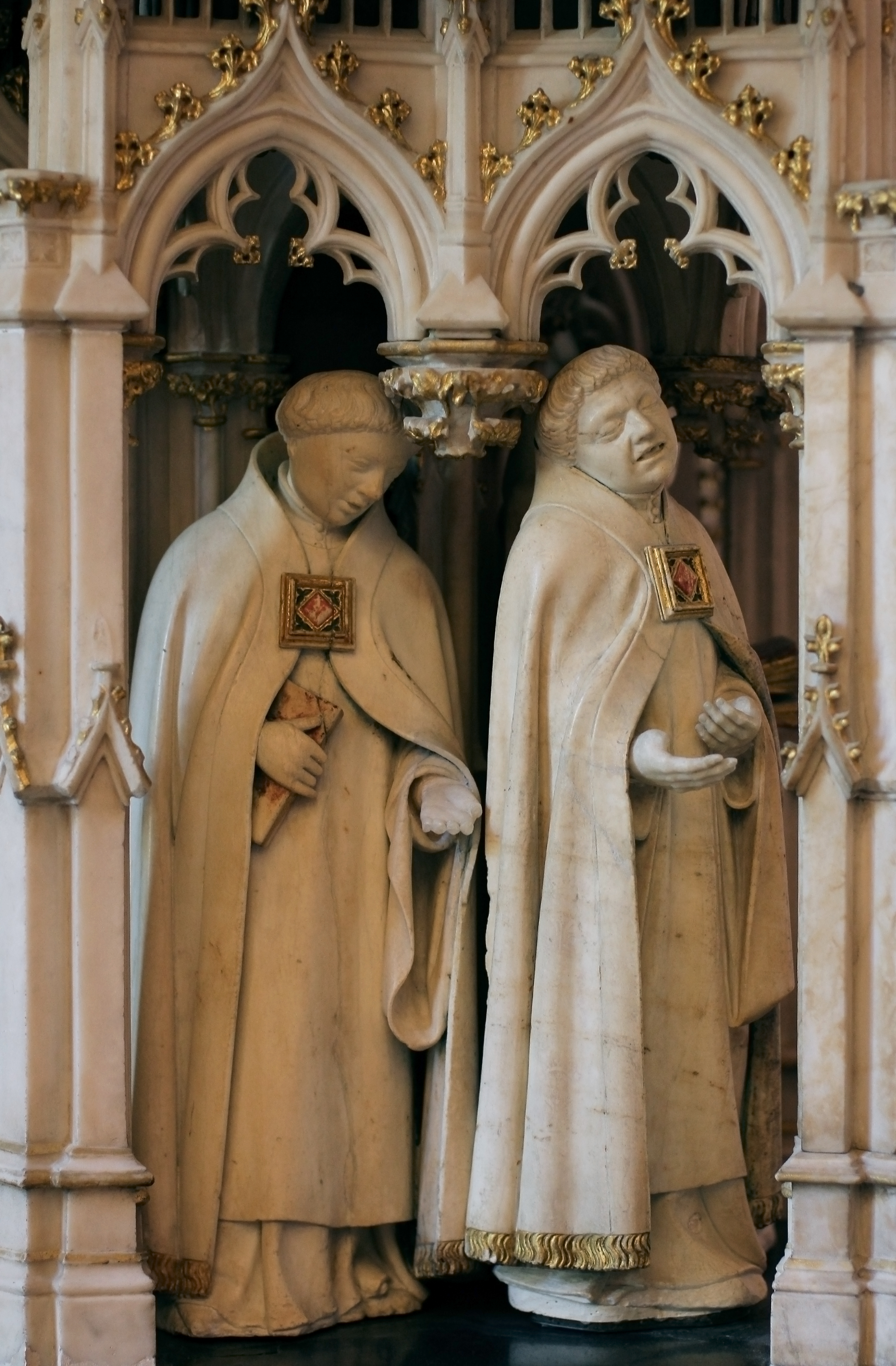

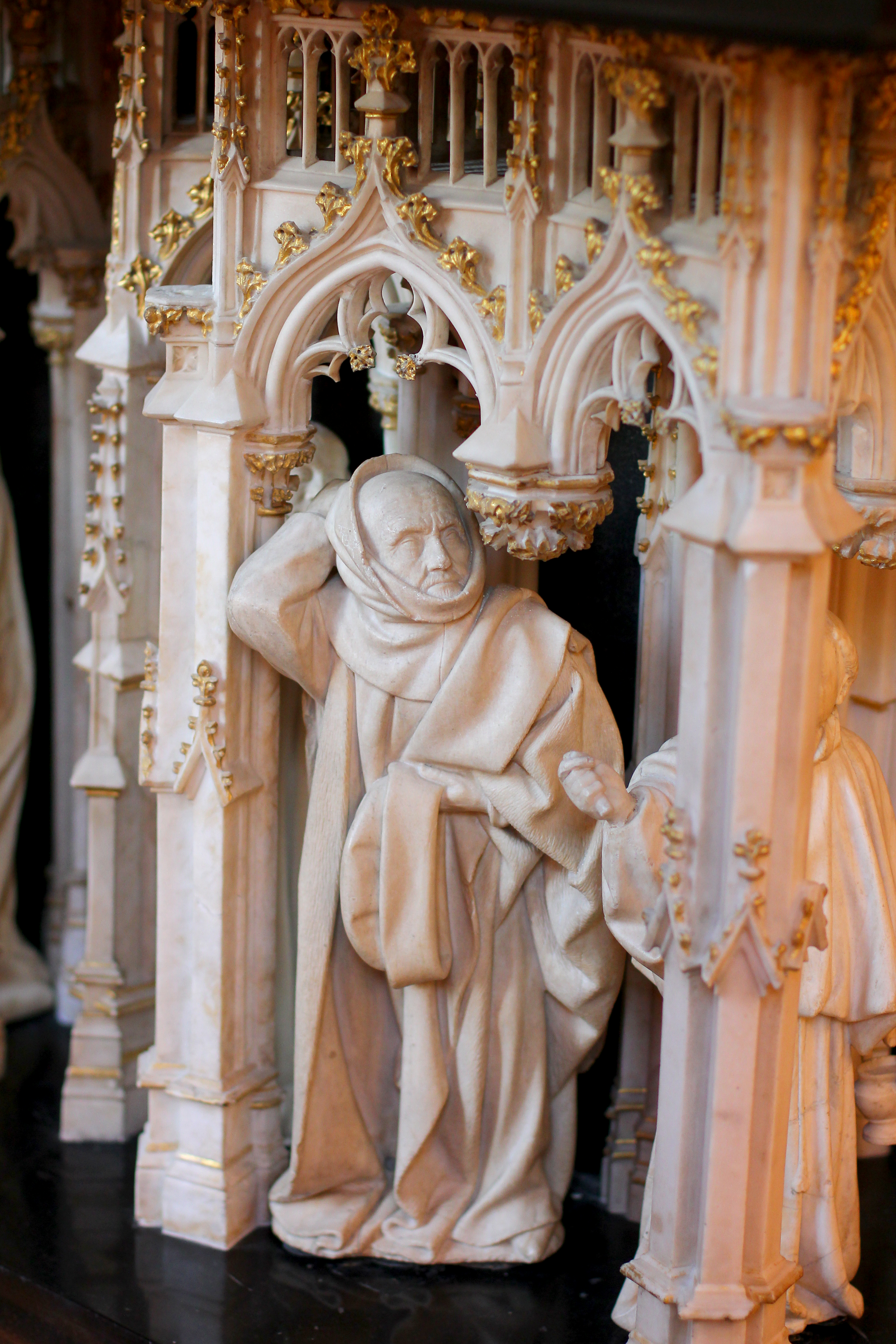

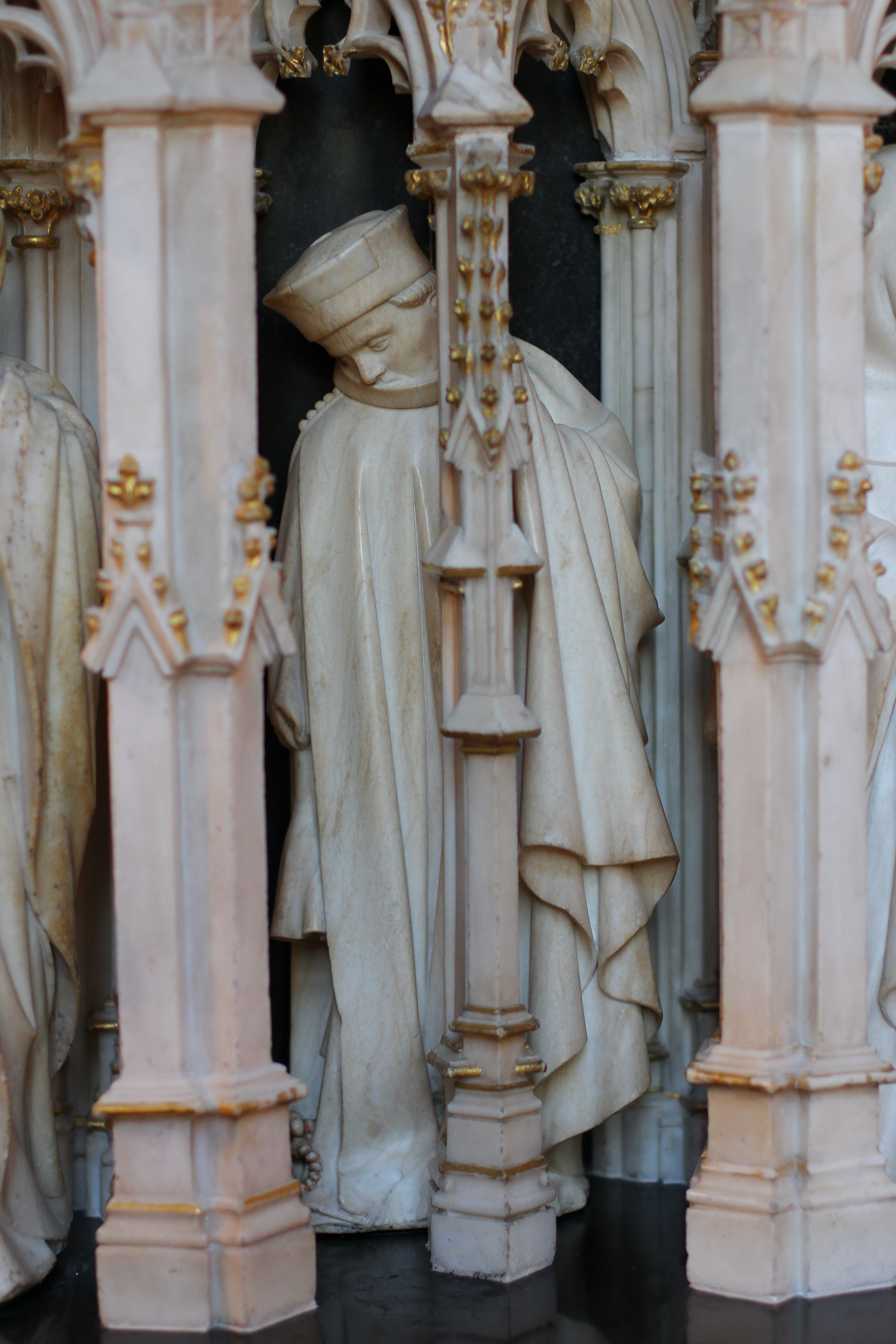

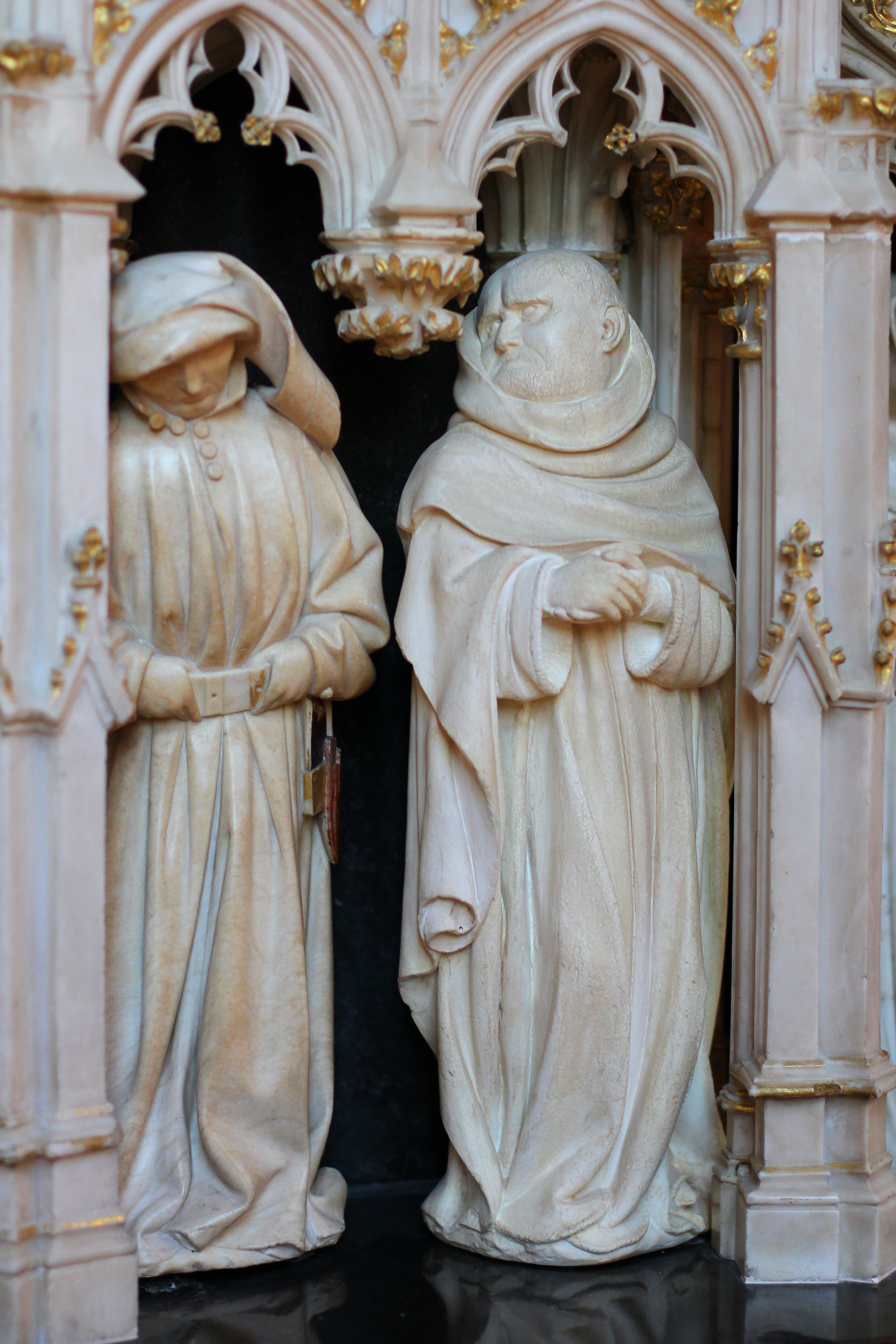

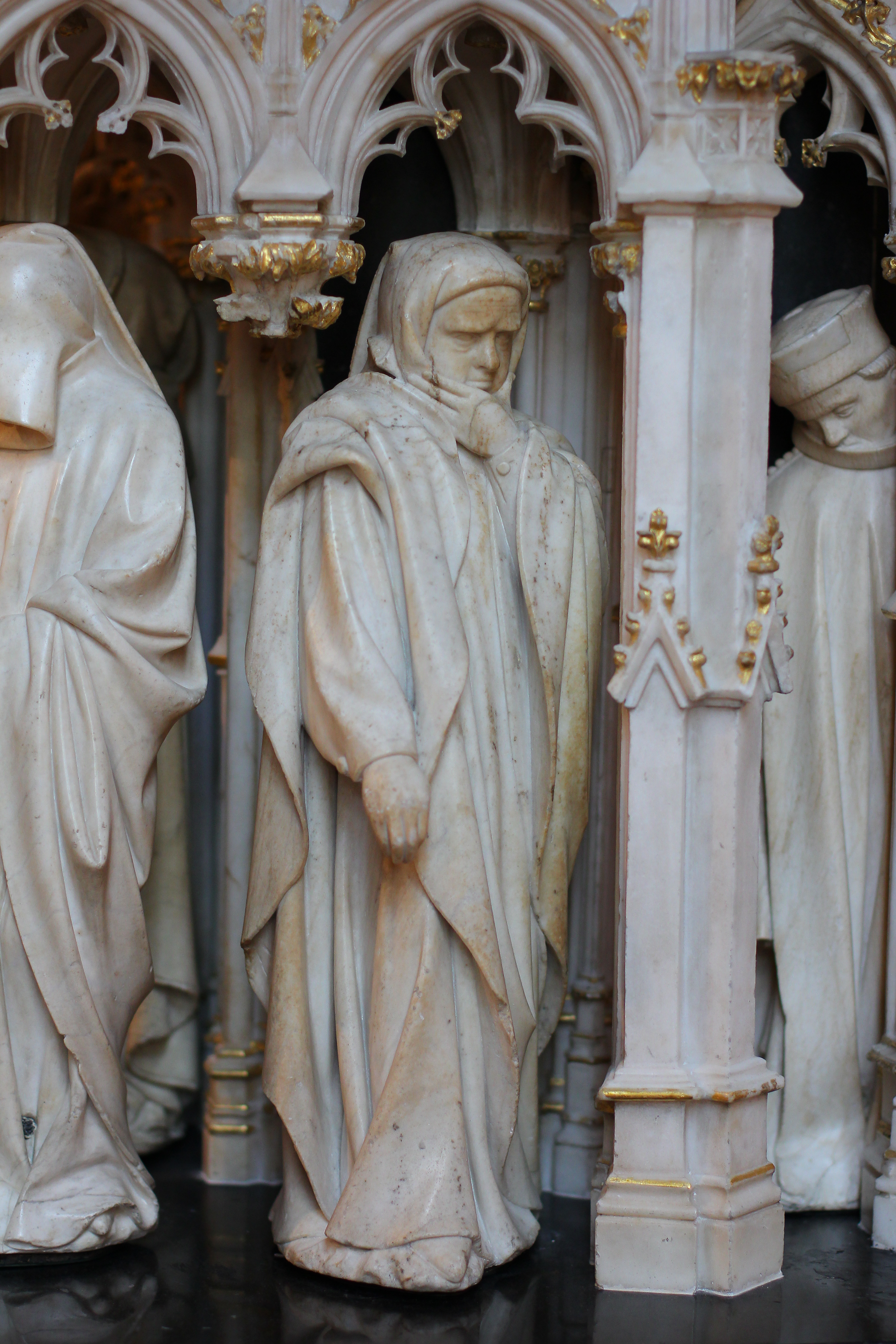

== Condition and influence ==
The charterhouse at Champmol was sacked and burned during the French Revolution, when the tomb was dismantled and some of its parts destroyed. Today both Philip and John's tombs are housed in the Musée des Beaux-Arts de Dijon. The slabs and effigies are in poor condition, with parts, especially around the feet, now lost. The effigies were reconstructed in 1819, in a project led by the architect Claude Saint-Pere, having been in the Salle des Gardes, Paris, since 1827. They were further restored in the early 21st century.

The style of an arcade with near life sized pleurants carrying a royal effigy became highly influential amongst contemporary sculptures, and can be seen in the monument for Philip's son John, the tombs of Isabella of Bourbon, Marguerite of Bourbon, Philippe Pot (d. 1493) and John, Duke of Berry.

== Sources ==
- Adams, Ann; Barker, Jessica (eds). "Revisiting the Monument: Fifty Years Since Panofsky’s Tomb Sculpture Archived 2025-03-29 at the Wayback Machine". London: Courtauld Institute of Art, 2016.
- Antoine, Elisabeth. Art from the Court of Burgundy: The Patronage of Philip the Bold and John the Fearless, 1364-1419. Seattle (WA): University of Washington, 2005. ISBN 978-2-7118-4864-5
- Jugie, Sophie. The Mourners: Tomb Sculpture from the Court of Burgundy . Paris: First Edition, 2010. ISBN 978-0-3001-5517-4
- Fossi, Gloria. Romanesque & Gothic. London: Sterling, 2008. ISBN 978-1-4027-5924-6
- Moffitt, John F. "Sluter's 'Pleurants' and Timanthes' 'Tristitia Velata': Evolution of, and Sources for a Humanist Topos of Mourning". Artibus et Historiae, vol. 26, no. 51, 2005. JSTOR 1483776
- Morand, Kathleen. Claus Sluter: Artist at the Court of Burgundy. London: Harvey Miller, 1991. ISBN 978-0-9052-0315-7
- Morand, Kathleen. "'Les Pleurants dans l'Art du Moyen Age en Europe' at Dijon". Burlington Magazine, volume 113, No. 823, 1971. pp. 620–624.JSTOR 876777
- Nicholas, Napoli. The Ethics of Ornament in Early Modern Naples. New York: Routledge, 2015. ISBN 978-1-4724-1963-7
- Nash, Susie. "The Two Tombs of Philip the Bold". Journal of the Warburg and Courtauld Institutes, vol. LXXXII, 2019
- Nash, Susie. Northern Renaissance art. Oxford: Oxford University Press, 2008. ISBN 0-19-284269-2
- Panofsky, Irvin. Tomb Sculpture: Its Changing Aspects from Ancient Egypt to Bernini. London: Harry Abrams, 1964. ISBN 978-0-8109-3870-0
- Porras, Stephanie. Art of the Northern Renaissance: Courts, Commerce and Devotion. London: Laurence King Publishing, 2018. ISBN 978-1-7862-7165-5
- Reeves, Matthew. "A Reconsideration of the Tomb of Jean de Berry for the Sainte-Chapelle at Bourges, its Inception, Revision and Reconstruction". Medieval History, Medieval Studies.
- Roberts, Ann. "The Chronology and Political Significance of the Tomb of Mary of Burgundy". The Art Bulletin, volume 71, no. 3, 1989. JSTOR 3051135
- Sadler, Donna. Stone, Flesh, Spirit: The Entombment of Christ in Late Medieval Burgundy. Brill, 2015. ISBN 978-9-0042-9314-4
- Scholten, Frits. "Isabella’s Weepers: Ten Statues from a Burgundian Tomb"'. Amsterdam: Rijksmuseum, 2007. ISBN 978-9-07145-0822
- Smith, Jeffrey Chipps. The Northern Renaissance (Art and Ideas). London: Phaidon Press, 2004. ISBN 978-0-7148-3867-0
- de Winter, Patrick. "Art from the Duchy of Burgundy". The Bulletin of the Cleveland Museum of Art, volume 74, no. 10, Winter 1987. JSTOR 25160010
- Woods, Kim (ed). Making Renaissance Art. Yale University Press, 2007. ISBN 978-0-3001-2189-6
