= Mourners of Dijon =

Tomb sculptures, representing mourners

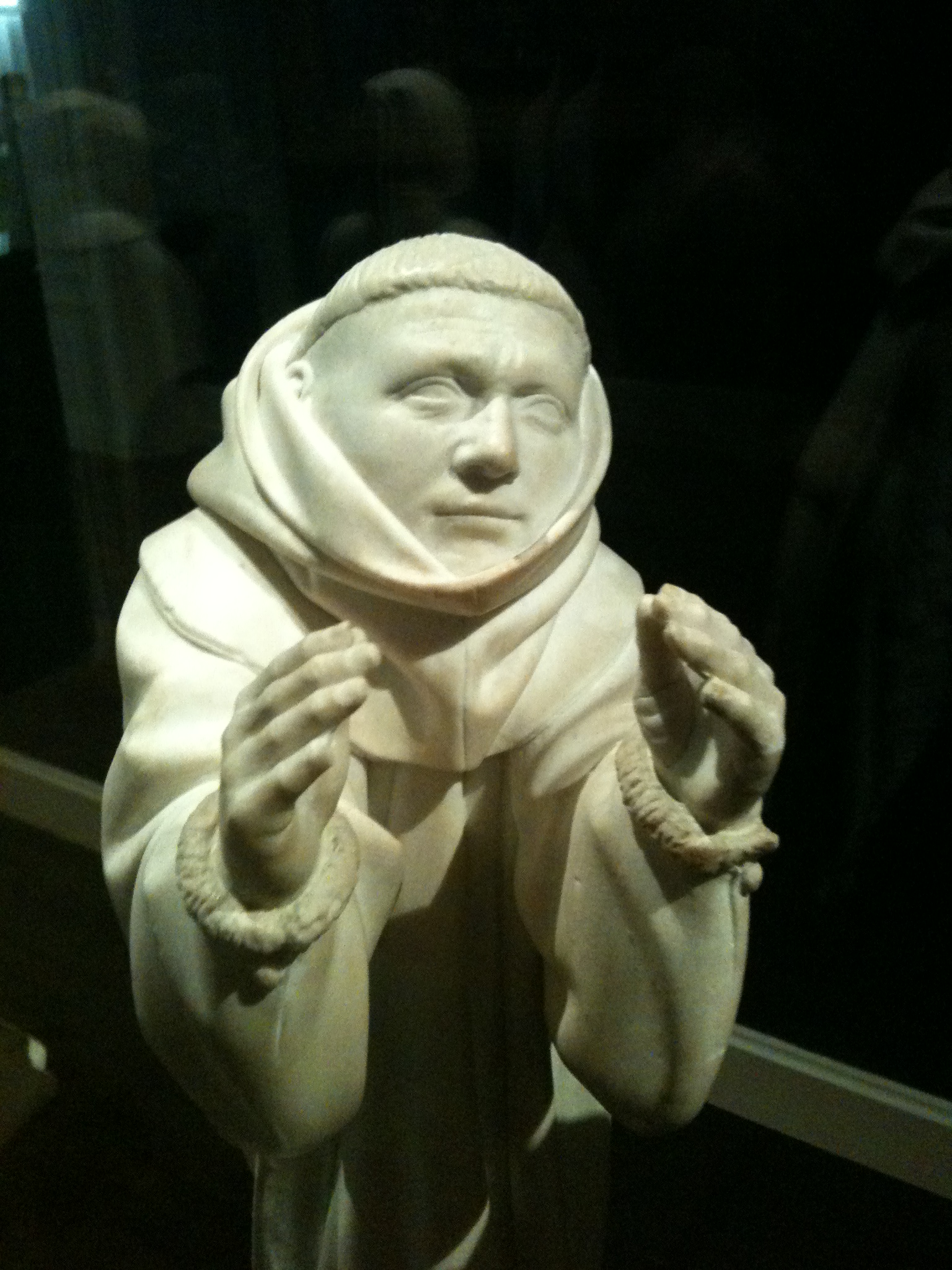
Claus Sluter, Pleurant nr 39

The Mourners of Dijon (pleurants of Dijon) are tomb sculptures made in Burgundy during the late fourteenth and early fifteenth centuries. They are part of a new iconographical tradition led by Claus Sluter that continued until the end of the fifteenth century. In this tradition, free-standing sculptures depict mourners who stand next to a bier or platform that holds a body in state. The figures are cloaked in robes which mostly hide their faces.

The Dutch historian Johan Huizinga described the tomb as the "most profound expression of mourning known in art, a funeral march in stone." John the Fearless commissioned the pleurants for his tomb, stipulating that they resemble those on his father's Tomb of Philip the Bold.

== Description ==
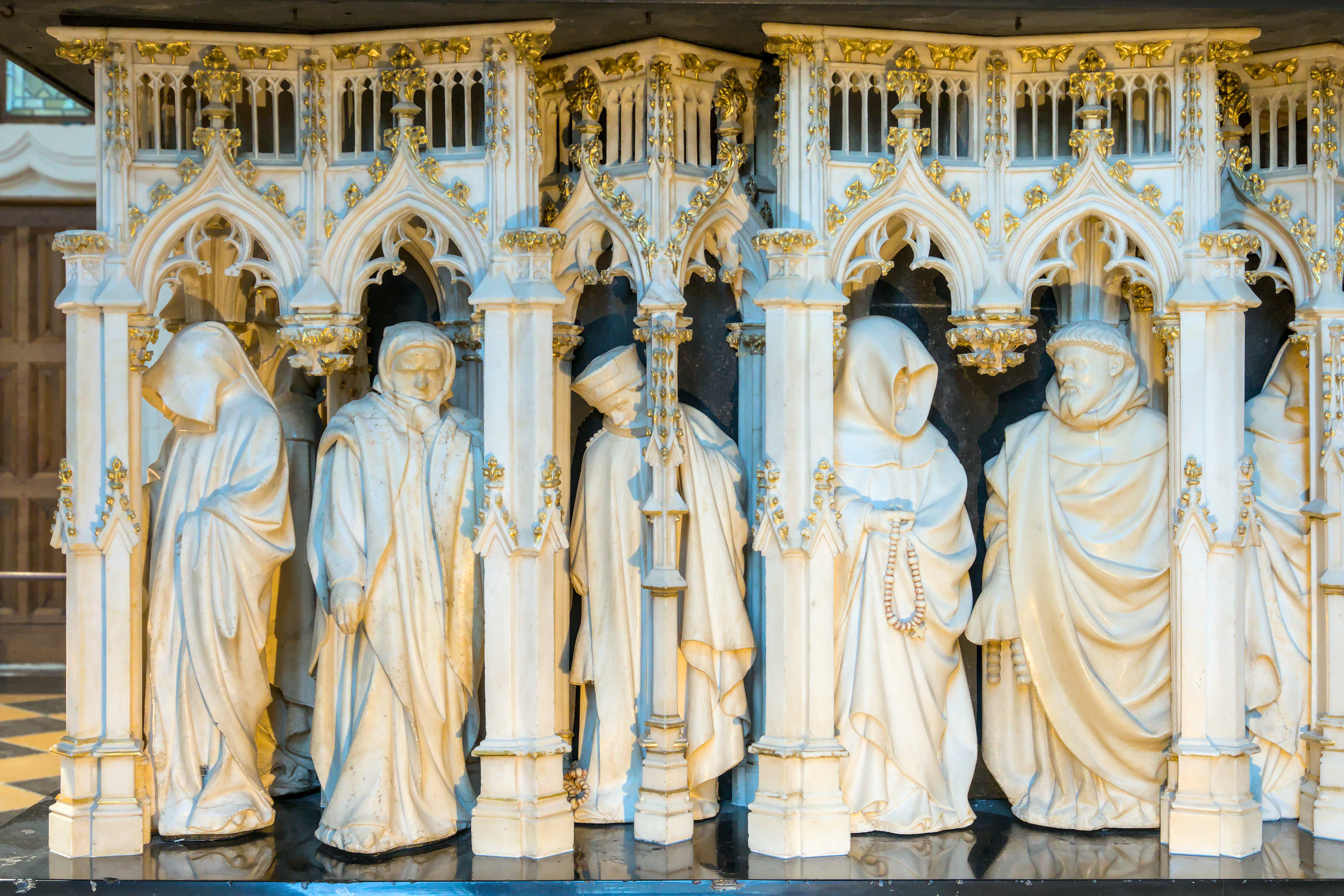
Mourners in the niches below the tomb of Philip the Bold.

The mourners stand sixteen inches high and originally occupied niches around the tomb of Philip the Bold (1342-1404), the first Duke of Burgundy, his son, John the Fearless (1371-1419), the second Duke of Burgundy, and John's wife, Margaret of Bavaria (1363-1423). The original location was Champmol, the Carthusian monastery in Dijon. The sculptures are now in the Musée des Beaux-Arts de Dijon. Journalist Fernand Auberjonois describes them this way: "Each mourner is a perfect example of medieval statuary. There are priests, monks, members of the ducal household, choirboys -- all demonstrating their grief and pain most eloquently, some with eyes turned toward the heavens, others wiping their tears on their sleeves ... ." Some of the mourners are enveloped entirely in drapery, a specialty of Sluter who "transformed Gothic drapery conventions into a highly personal means of expression."

The tomb originally contained 82 mourners, but after it was dismantled during the French Revolution in 1794, over a dozen of the mourners went missing. Some ended up in Dijon homes, others were marketed to museums and private collectors. In 1819, the architect Claude Saintpere restored the tombs and replaced some of the sculptures. In 1945, Englishman Percy Moore-Turner returned a choirboy sculpture to Dijon. Soon after, the Louvre donated its mourner and the Cluny Museum returned two mourners, one of which was a monk that had been owned by the Duke of Hamilton. American collector Clarence Mackay bought four mourners from French collectors who had purchased them from a shop in Nancy, France. When Mackay died, his estate sold the sculptures to the Cleveland Museum of Art, where they remain today. In 1959, Sherman Lee, Director of the Cleveland Museum, gave replicas of that museum's mourners to the Dijon Museum. Two of the niches remain empty and it is presumed those sculptures were destroyed during the French Revolution. Thirty-nine of the sculptures were shown at seven American museums during a 2010-2012 tour organized by the French Regional & American Museums Exchange.

== Attribution ==
The sculptures on the tomb of Philip the Bold (completed in 1410) are probably the work of Claus Sluter, Hannequin de Prindale and Claus de Werve. The pleurants on the tombs of John the Fearless and Margaret of Bavaria are considered imitations of those on the tomb of Philip the Bold. Juan de la Huerta began these in 1443 and Antoine Le Moiturier completed them by 1470.

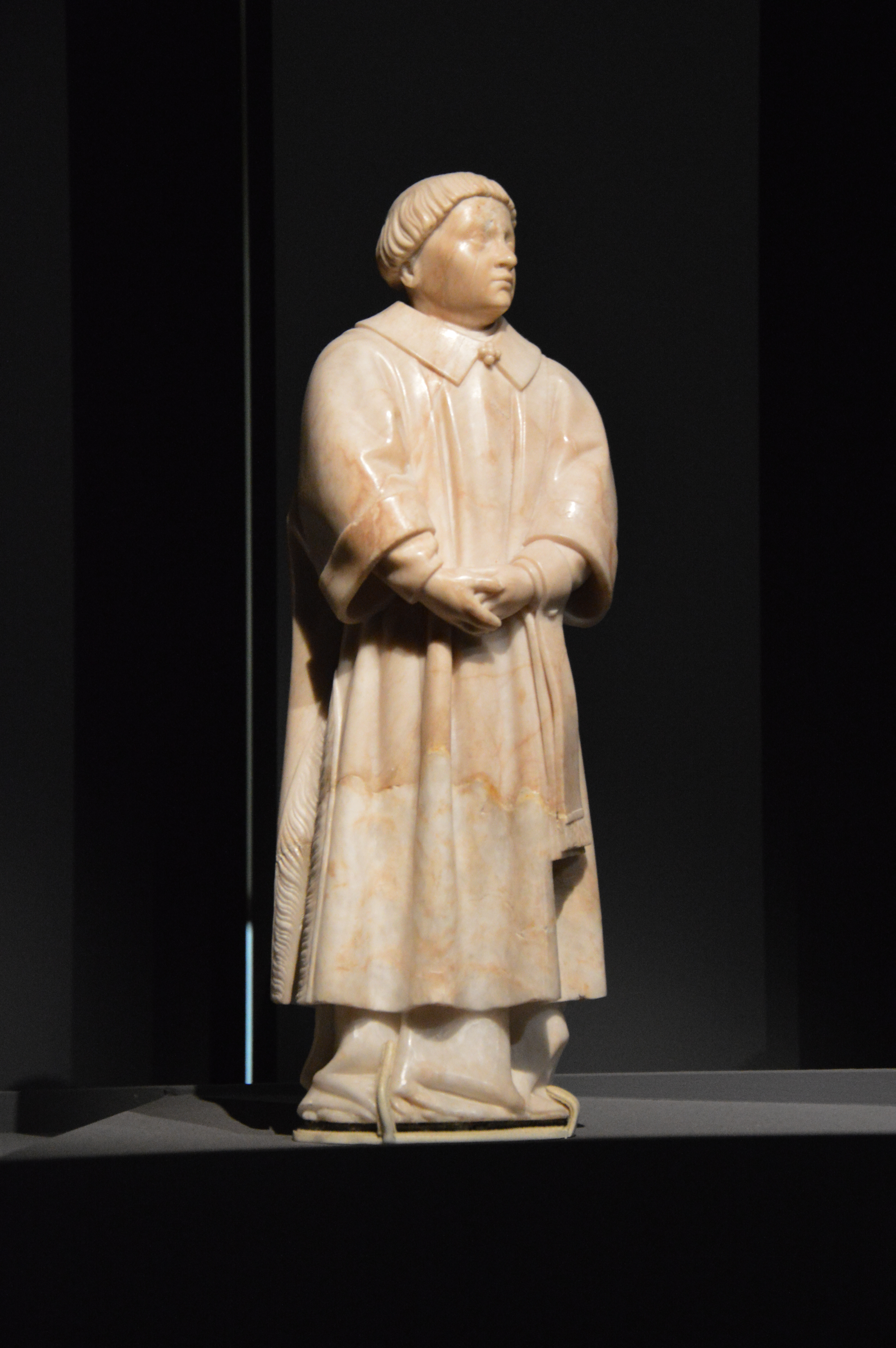
Mourner 44

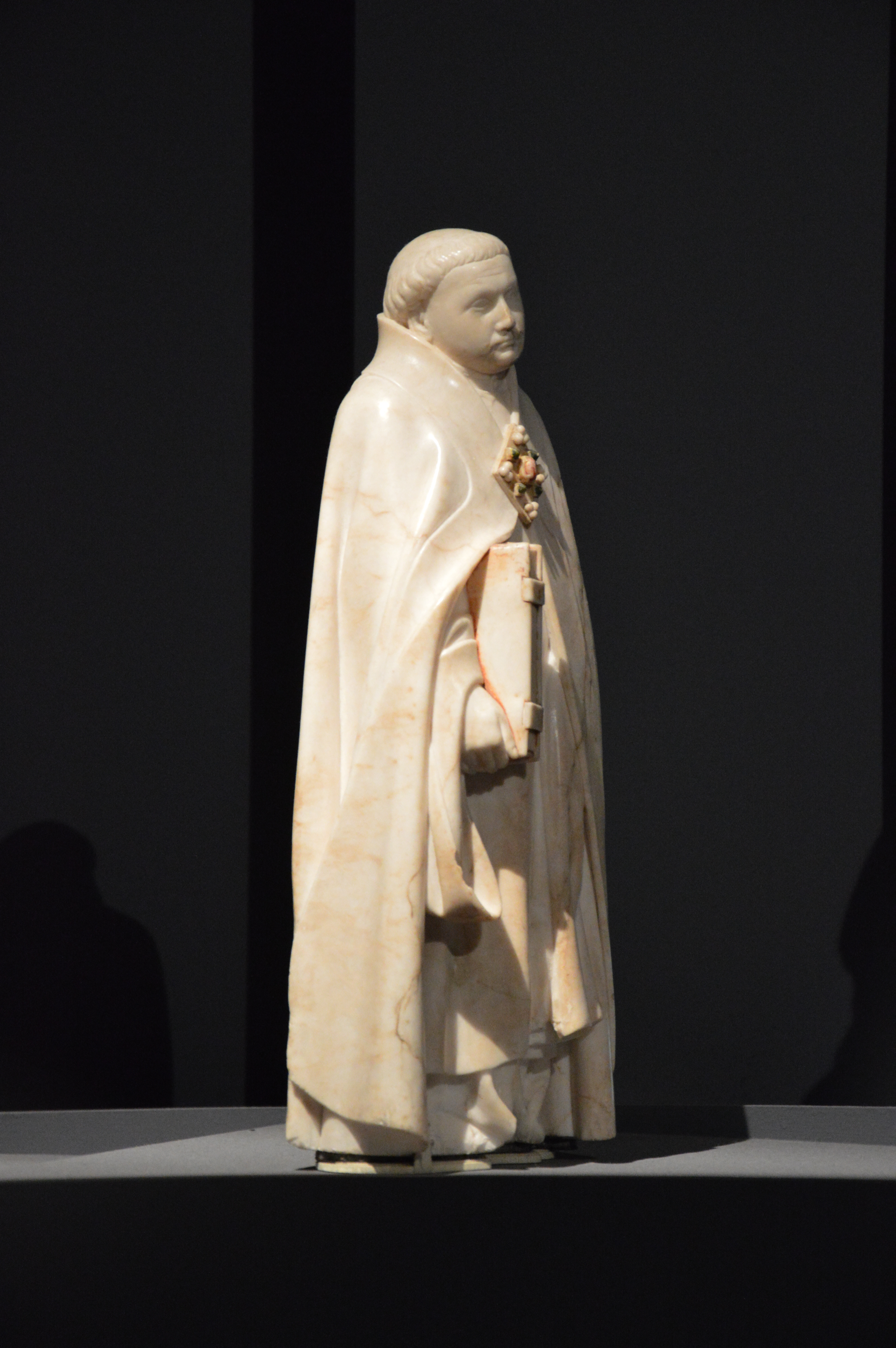
Mourner 46

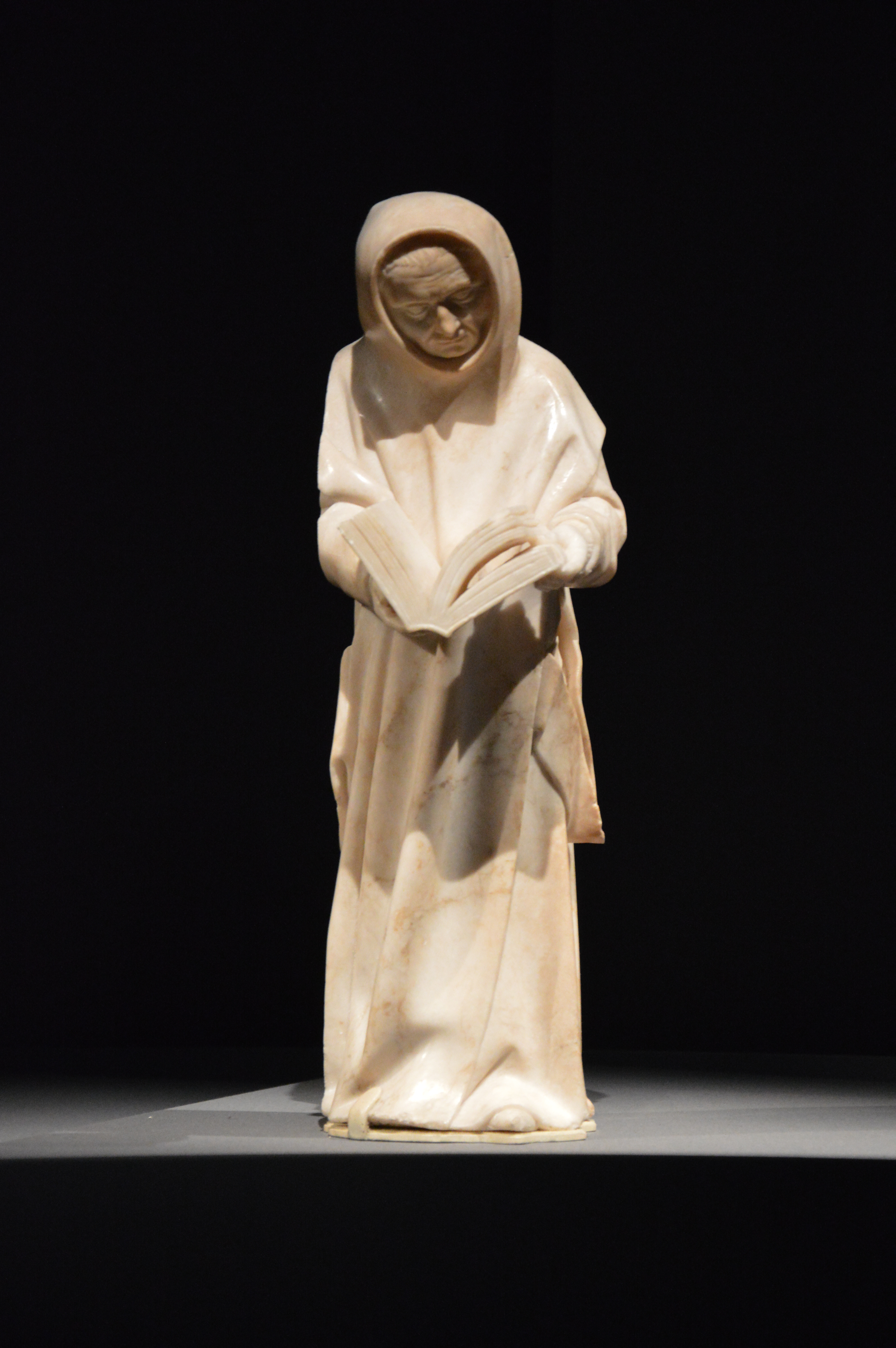
Mourner 50

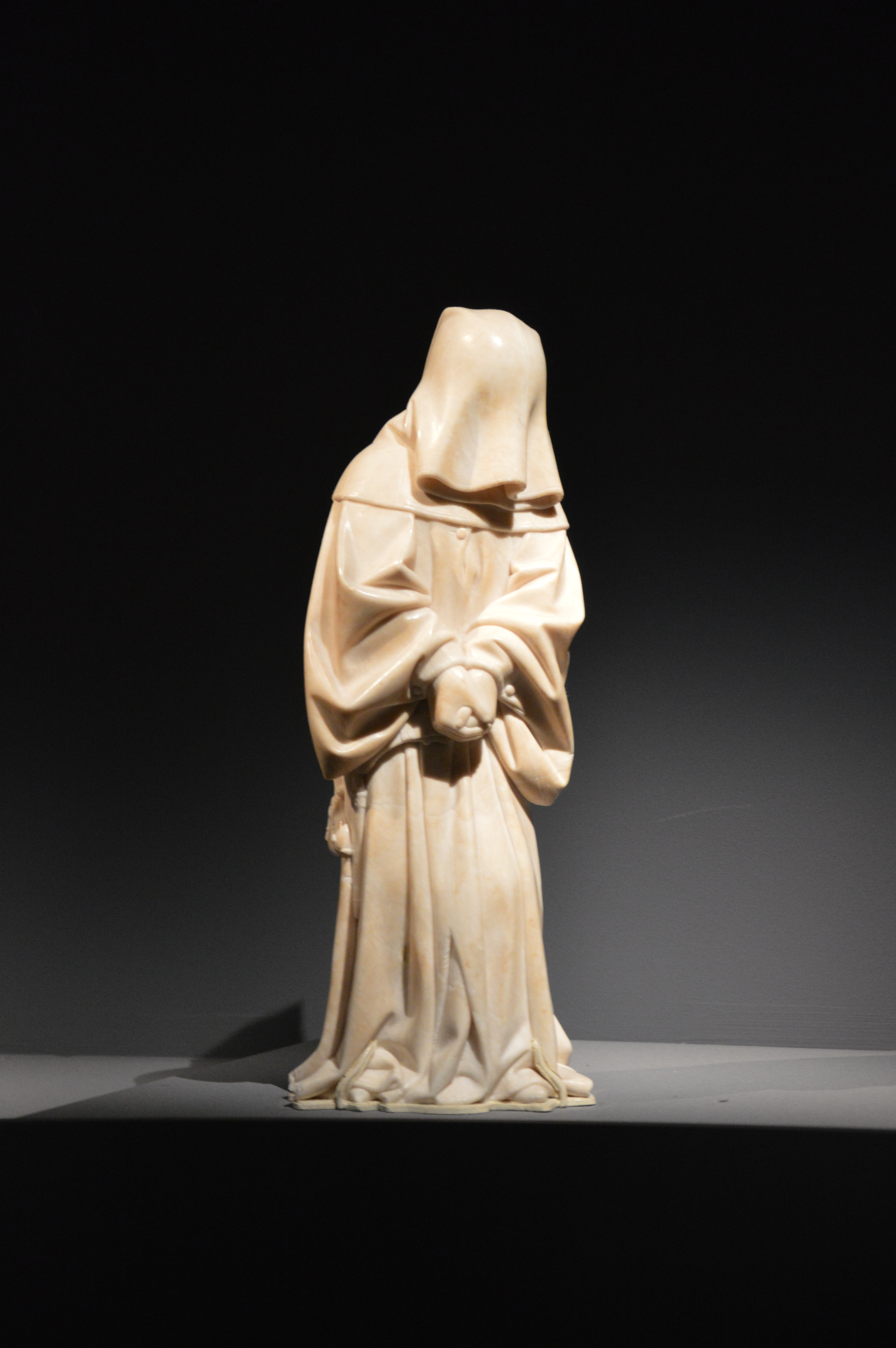
Mourner 53

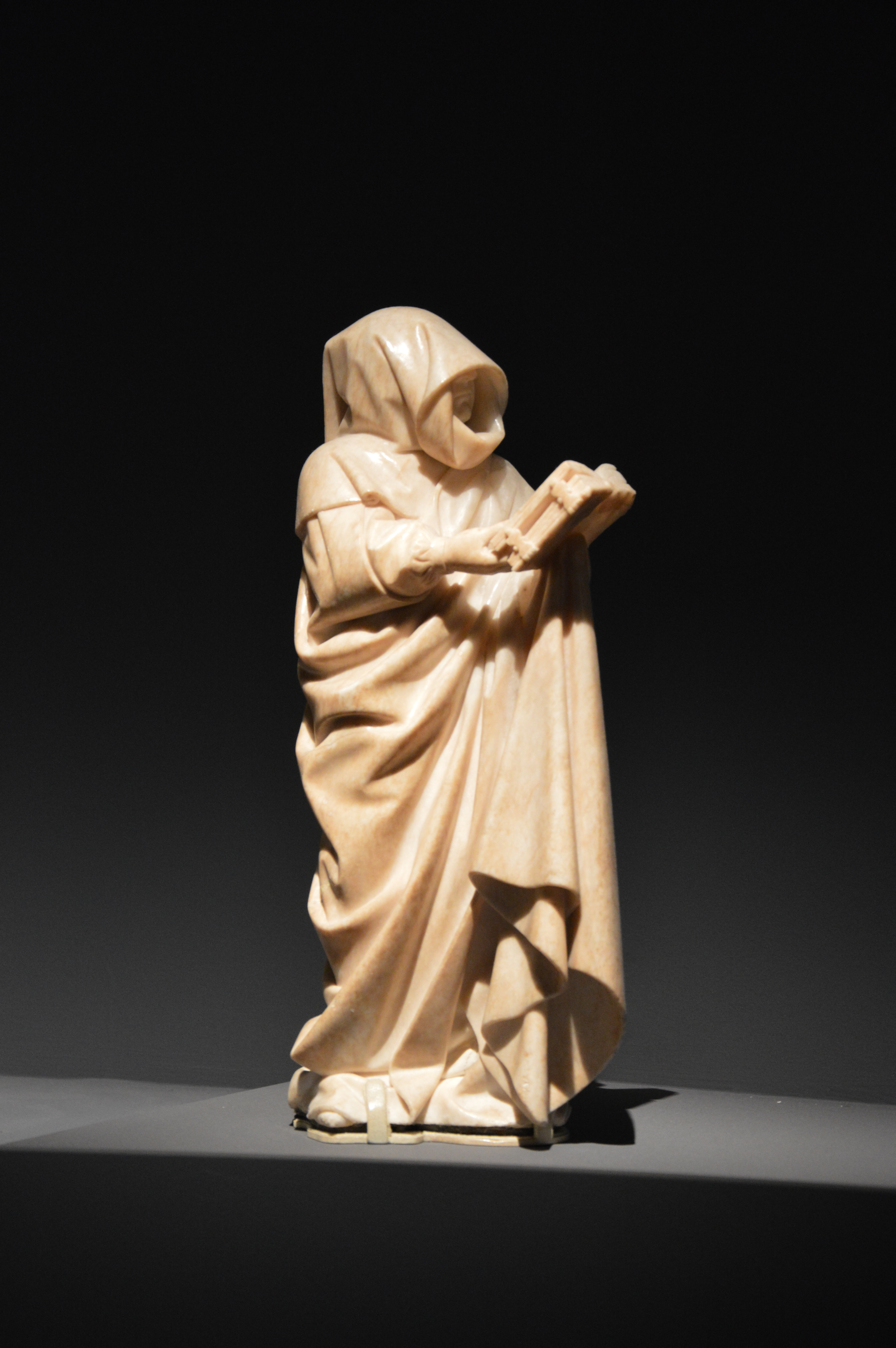
Mourner 54

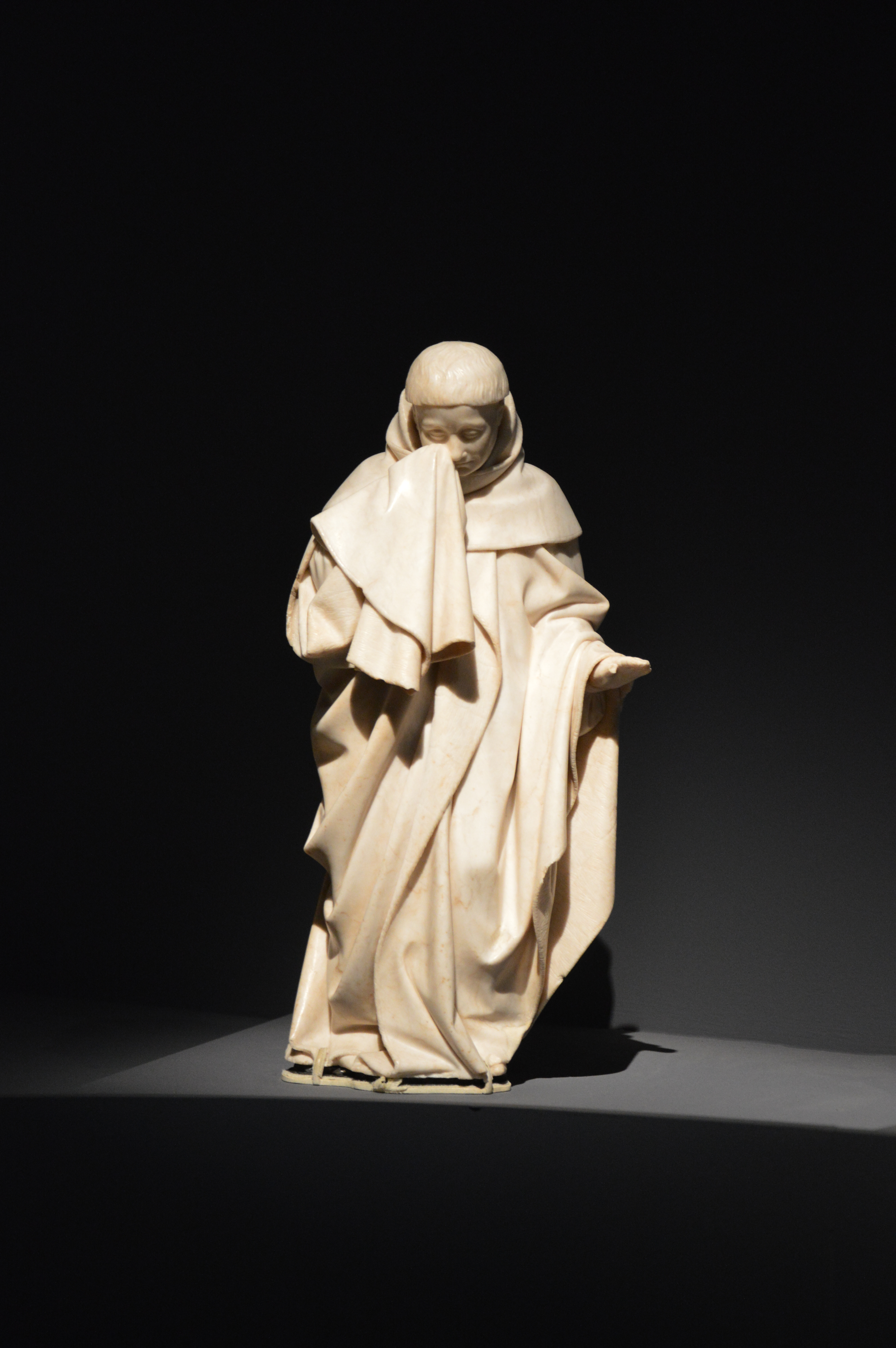
Mourner 55

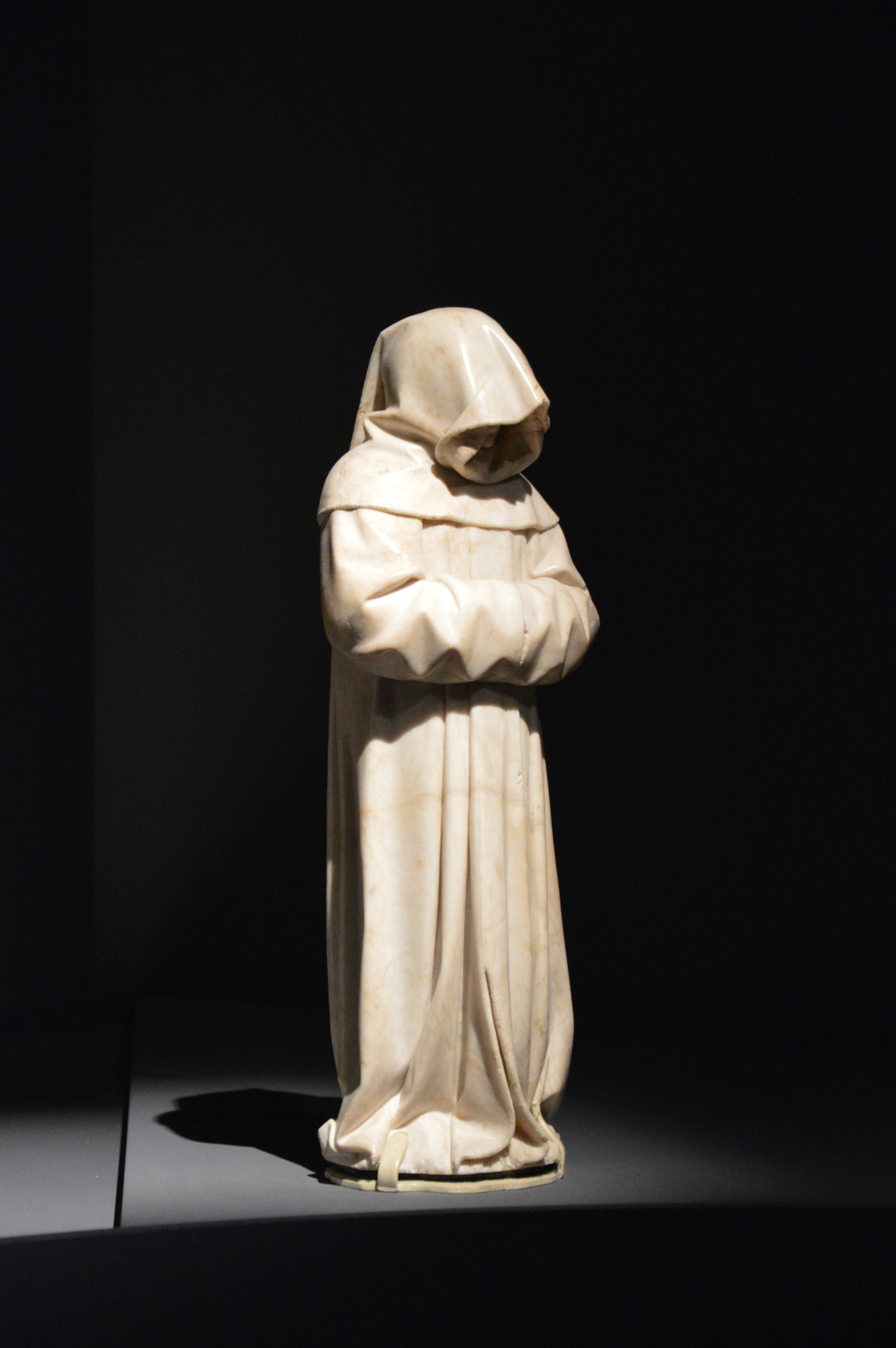
Mourner 56

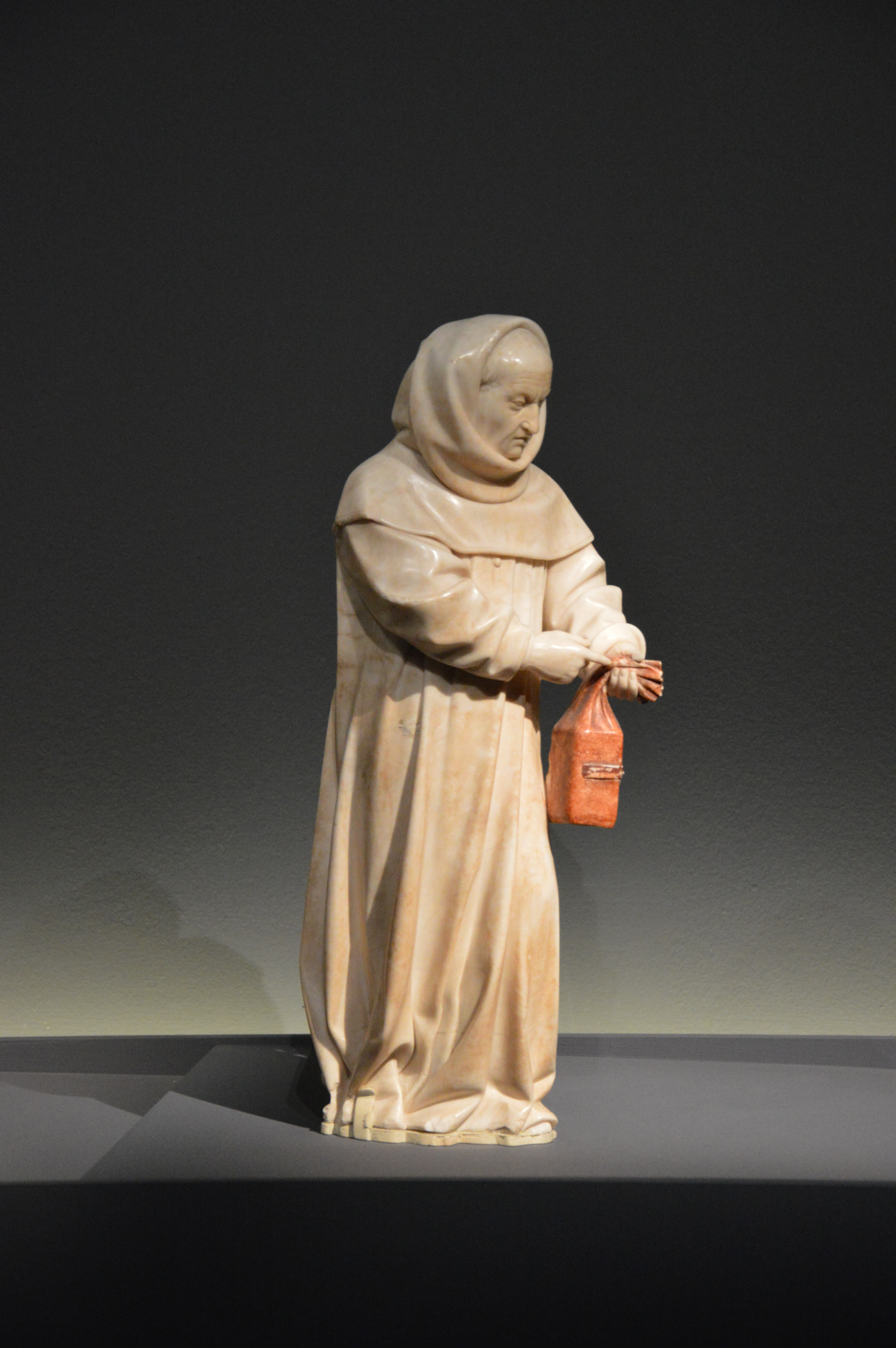
Mourner 63

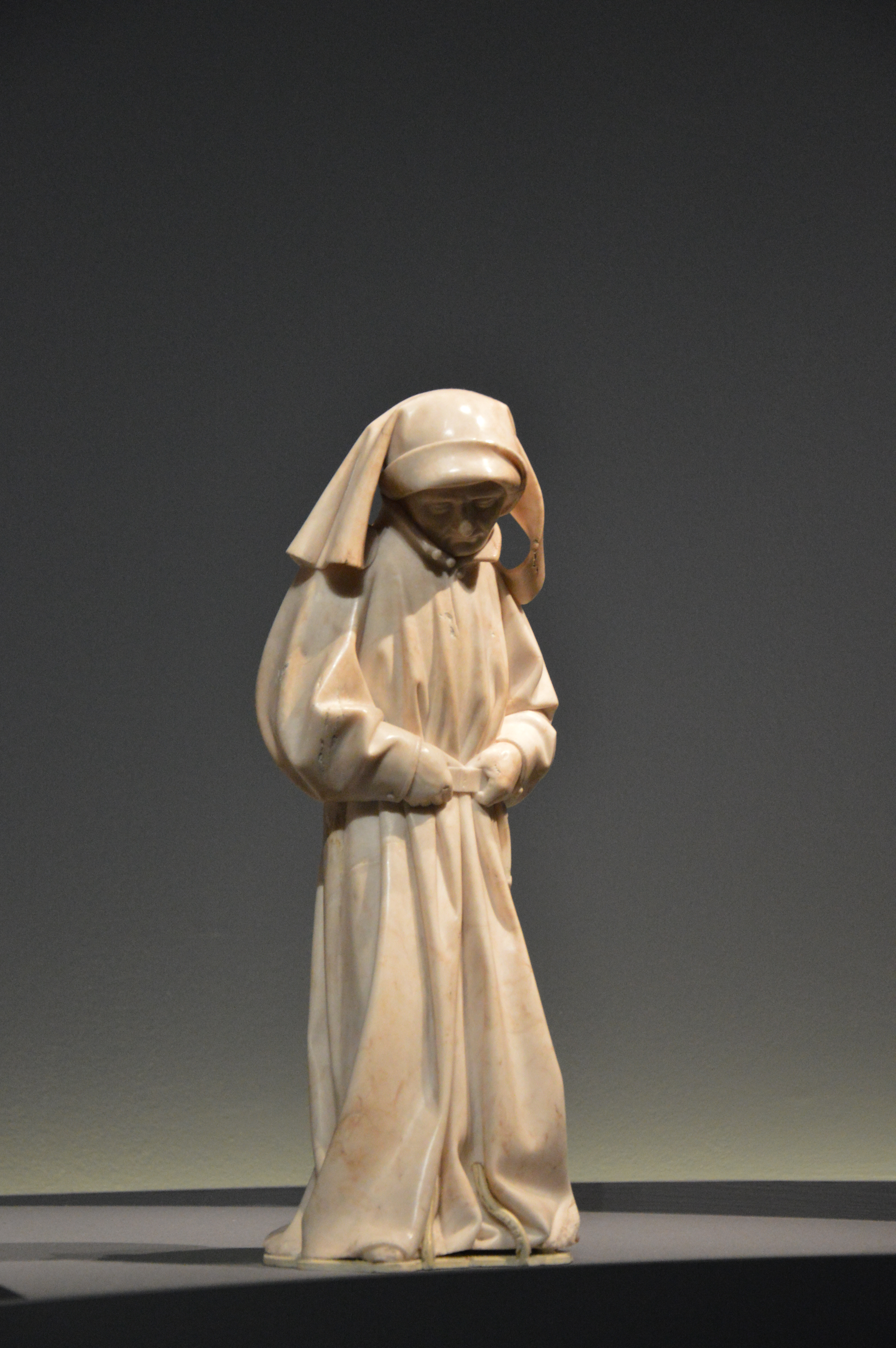
Mourner 73

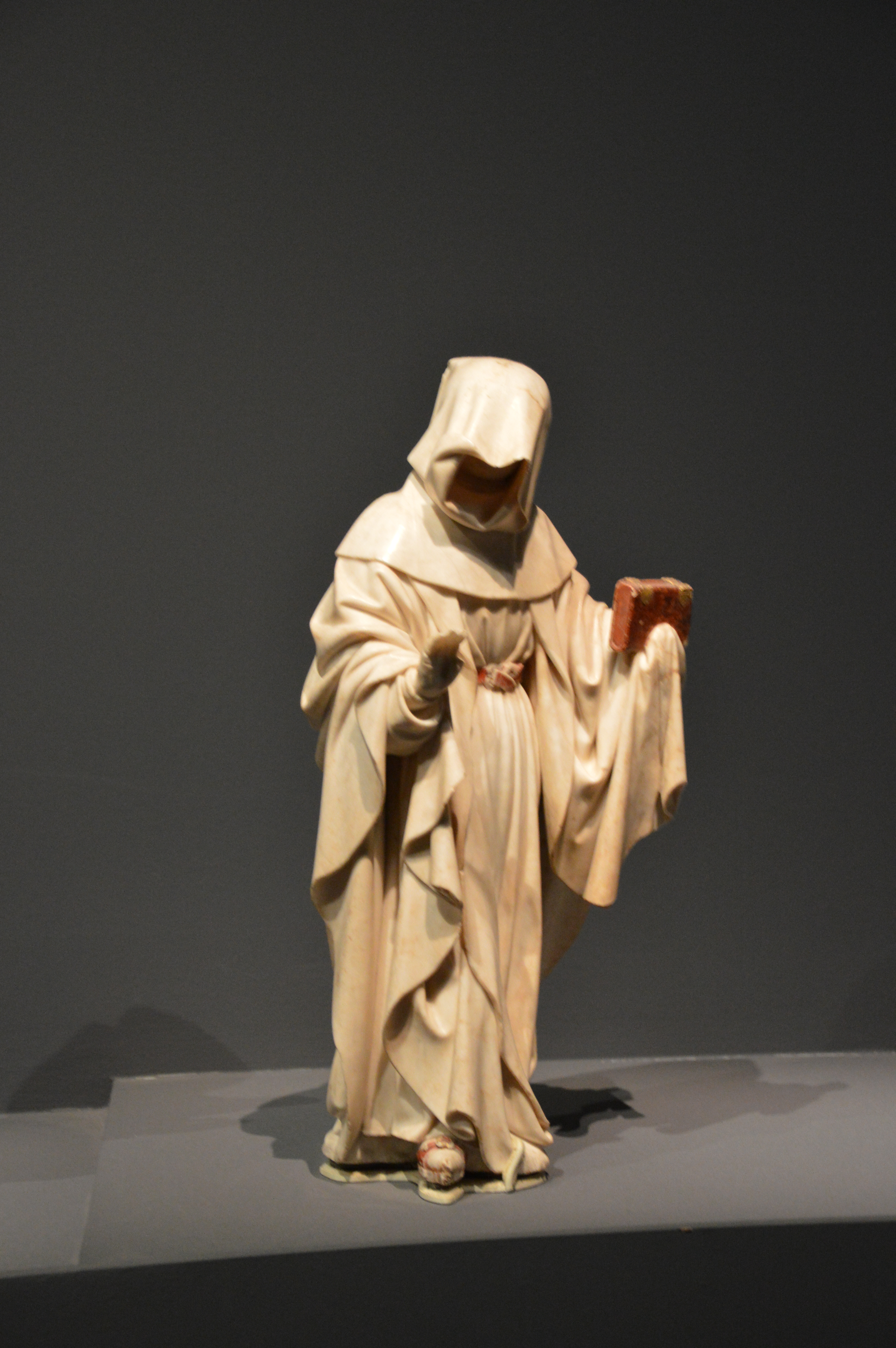
Mourner 78

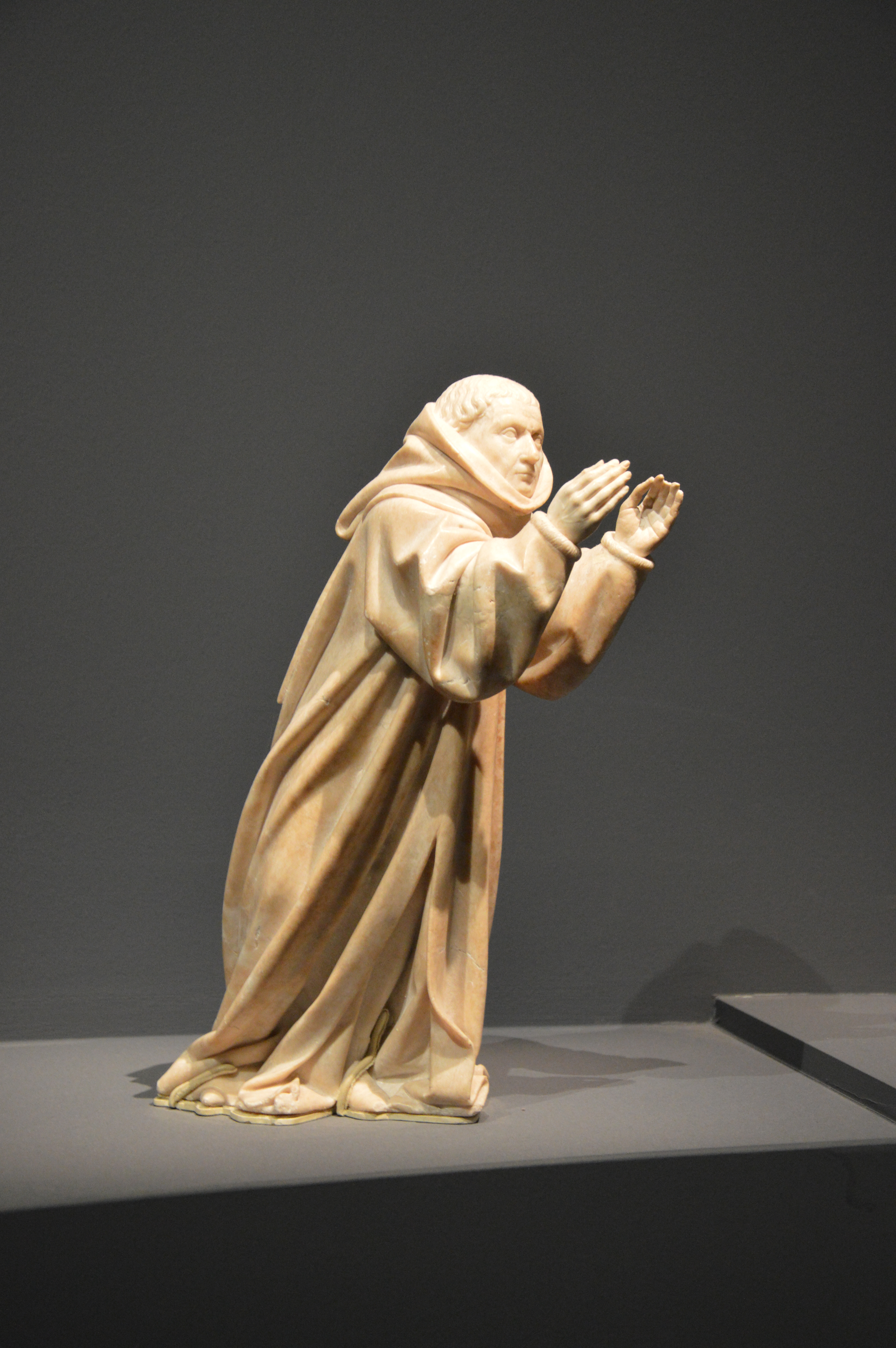
Mourner 79

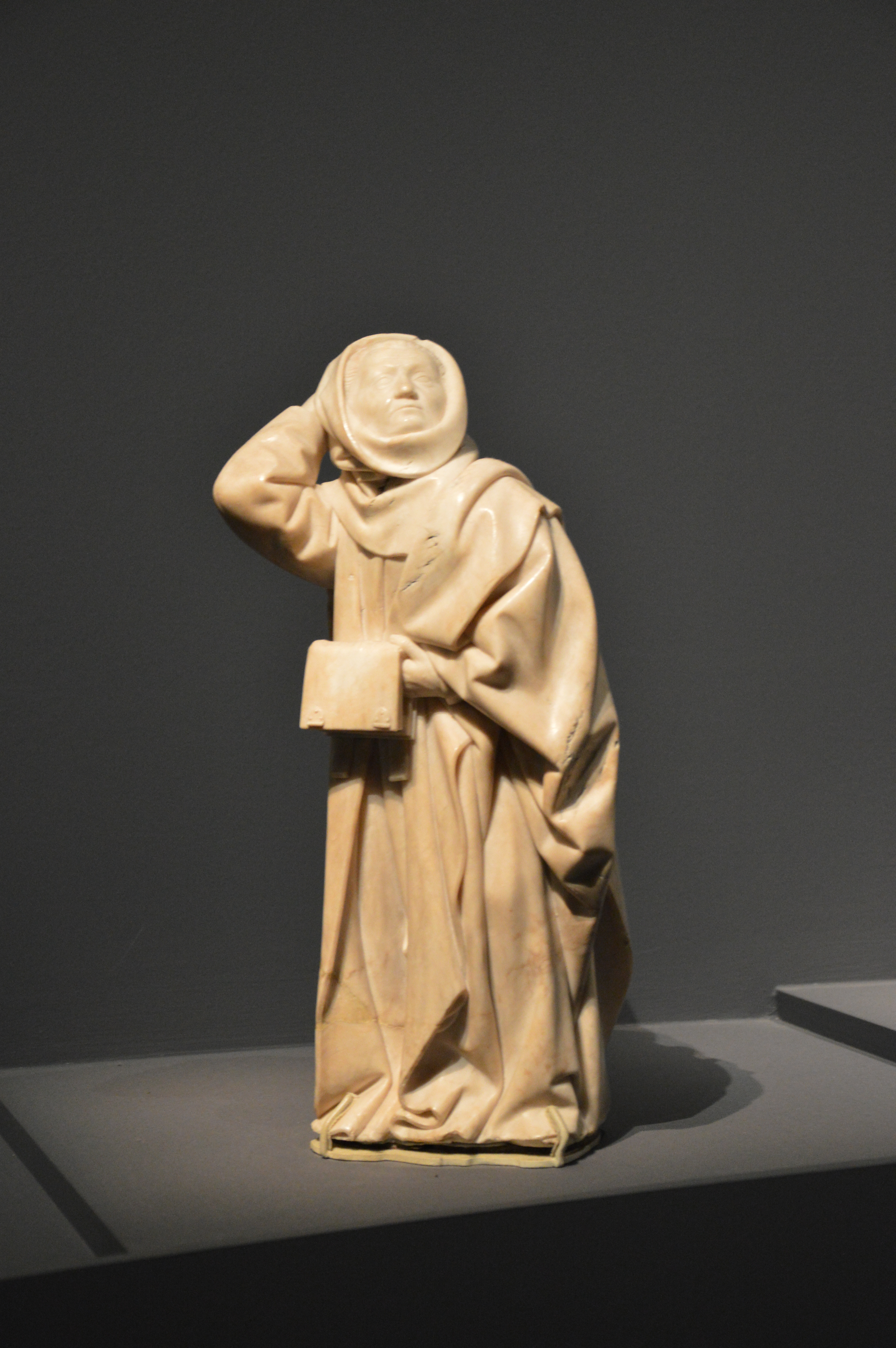
Mourner 80

== Sources ==
- Antoine, Elisabeth. Art from the Court of Burgundy: The Patronage of Philip the Bold and John the Fearless, 1364-1419. Seattle (WA): University of Washington, 2005. ISBN 978-2-7118-4864-5
- Hofstatter, Hans H. Art of the Late Middle Ages. Harry N. Abrams, 1968
- Jugie, Sophie. The Mourners: Tomb Sculptures from the Court of Burgundy. New Haven: Yale University Press, 2010
- Nash, Susie. Northern Renaissance art. Oxford: Oxford University Press, 2008. ISBN 0-19-284269-2
- Moffitt, John F. "Sluter's 'Pleurants' and Timanthes' 'Tristitia Velata': Evolution of, and Sources for a Humanist Topos of Mourning". Artibus et Historiae, vol. 26, no. 51, 2005. JSTOR 1483776
- Panofsky, Irvin. Tomb Sculpture: Its Changing Aspects from Ancient Egypt to Bernini. London: Harry Abrams, 1964. ISBN 978-0-8109-3870-0
- Sadler, Donna. Stone, Flesh, Spirit: The Entombment of Christ in Late Medieval Burgundy. Brill, 2015. ISBN 978-9-0042-9314-4
