= Jean de Marville =

French sculptor

Jean de Marville (died July 1389) was a sculptor who worked at the end of the fourteenth century. He is known for his work on the Carthusian monastery of Champmol for Philip the Bold, Duke of Burgundy at a time when the Burgundy became a major cultural centre of Europe.

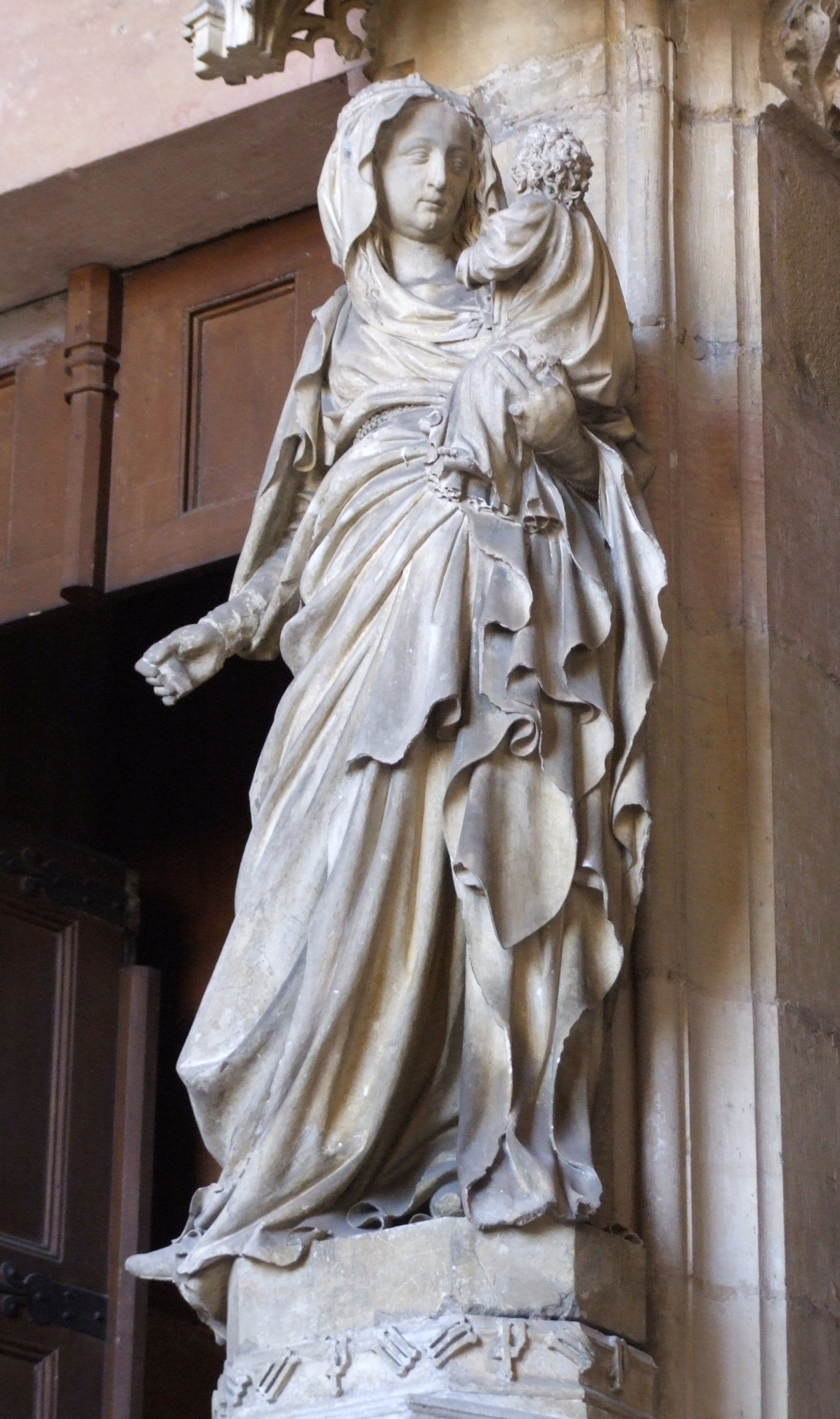
Virgin and child, detail of the portal, Chartreuse de Champmol, Dijon, Burgundy, France

== Life ==
From his name it appears that de Marville originated in Marville in what is now the department of Meuse, in northern France. He worked in Burgundy. Some say that he was Flemish. He is also known by the names Hennequin or Hannequin de Marvile, Jan van Mergem, Jehan de Marville or de Mervile.

The Jean or Hennequin de Marville who worked on the tomb of Philip the Bold has been identified with the Jean de Menreville who was named in 1366 as working on the church of Saint-Pierre at Lille. He is named as working in Rouen Cathedral in 1369, where he helped decorate the chapel of the king's heart at the command of King Charles V of France. He joined the service of Philip the Bold on 22 January 1372 as ymagier et valet de chambre de Monseigneur. (Note: "ymagier", or "image maker" means sculptor. "Valet de chambre" means he was a member of the duke's household.) The next year he moved to Dijon on the command of the Duke. An account from 27 January 1377 records the purchase of 26 pounds of ivory for Mainreville, tailleur de menues oeuvres. Based on this an ivory figure of the Trinity in the Museum of Fine Arts, Houston may be attributed to him.

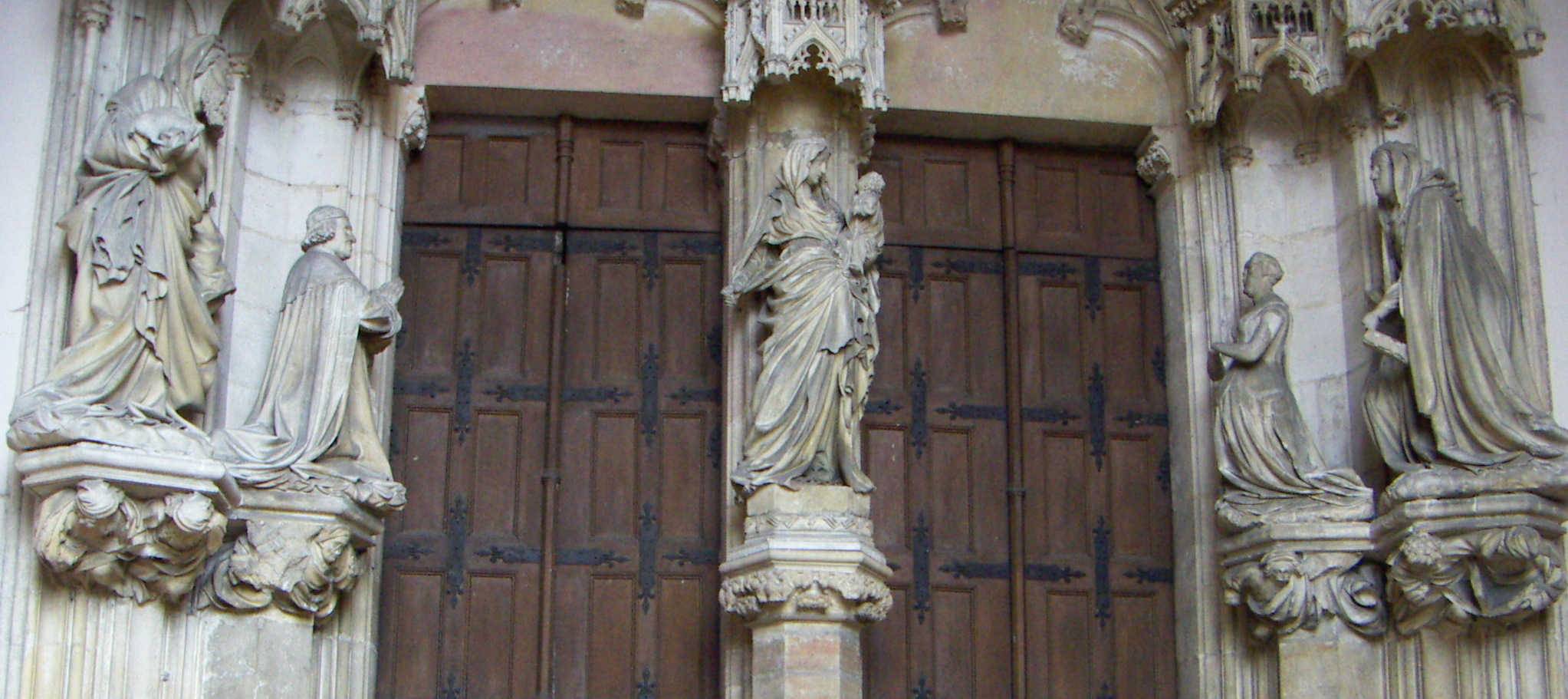
Portal of the Chartreuse Champmol, Dijon, Claus Sluter

Jean de Marville created an important school of sculpture. Claus Sluter was the most noted member. Sluter's nephew Claus de Werve was another member of this school. Lesser sculptors of this school were Jehan de la Huerta and Antoine le Moiturier. Claus Sluter (c. 1360 - 1405), a sculptor from Harlem in the Netherlands, joined Jean de Marville's studio in 1383. At that time de Marville was directing the construction and decoration of the Chartreuse of Champanol, which was to be the Duke's burial place. The image of the virgin and child in the center pillar of the monastery's chapel is attributed to either Marville or Sluter.

On 29 March 1381 Marville was charged by the Duke with making an alabaster sepulcher for him in Dijon, and the work was started in October 1384. Sluter succeeded Jean de Marville as ymagier when he died in 1389. There seems little doubt that the bulk of the work was done by Sluter, or under Sluter's direction, since it was not completed until 1404. (Note: M. Dehaisnes considers that the tomb was almost complete at the time of Marville's death, but other evidence shows it was still incomplete in 1404.) The tomb is unusual in being decorated with free-standing statues of monks, clergy and laity rather than the conventional relief figures. This concept may have been Marville's, but could have been a change introduced by Sluter when he took charge of completing the project.

== Notes and references ==
Notes

Citations

Sources

- Baudoin, Jacques (1996). "Jean de Marville". Bourgogne, Franche-Comté. EDITIONS CREER. ISBN 978-2-909797-17-5.
- Chabeuf, Henri (1891). Jean de La Huerta: Antoine Le Moiturier et le Tombeau de Jean sans Peur. imp. Darantière. p. 11.
- Cornereau, Armand (1890). Mémoires de la Société bourguignonne de géographie et d'histoire. Société bourguignonne de géographie.
- Société de l'Ecole des chartes (1884). Bibliothèque de l'École des chartes. Decourchant.
- Vauchez, André; Dobson, Richard Barrie; Lapidge, Michael (2000). Encyclopedia of the Middle Ages. Cerf. ISBN 978-1-57958-282-1.
- Woods, Kim (2007). Making Renaissance Art. Yale University Press. p. 110. ISBN 978-0-300-12189-6.
