= Tomb Sculpture: Its Changing Aspects from Ancient Egypt to Bernini =

Book cover for "Tomb Sculpture"

Tomb Sculpture: Its Changing Aspects from Ancient Egypt to Bernini 1964 book by the German art historian Erwin Panofsky. It is based on a series of four lectures. The book has been highly influential on the to then underdeveloped study of funerary art. Panofsky said that he was not satisfied with the book's completeness, and it became his last published work before his death in 1968. He acknowledged the challenge of scope in his introduction, admitting his reserve on impinging on the "preserves of many adjacent disciplines" in which he is not an expert.

== Scope ==
Although broader than any earlier publications on the topic, the lectures often stray into descriptions of specific works and its scope ends in the 17th century. In a very positive contemporary review, the art historian Jan Białostocki praises Panofsky's lectures as a breakthrough but clarifies that its "treatment of the subject is synthetic and that only the most general outlines of tomb sculpture's development, both in the field of iconography and style, are given."

The art historian Susie Nash noted in her 2016 article "Fifty Years Since Panofsky’s 'Tomb Sculpture'" that the topic was at the time so understudied that the reader can discern Panofsky "attempting to codify funerary imagery by formulating its terminology". She credits him with introducing many new terms (usually in French) into the discourse including the "enfeu", "Arts Bereft" and "activation of the effigy". He described double-decker cadaver tombs as tombeaux de grande cérémonie, and originated the term demi-gisants to describe effigies that show the deceased sitting up and supported by their elbows.

== See also ==
- Funerary art
- Tomb effigy

== Sources ==
- Adams, Ann; Barker, Jessica (eds.) "Revisiting The Monument: Fifty Years since Panofsky’s Tomb Sculpture". Cambridge: Courtauld Institute of Art, 2016. ISBN 978-1-9074-8506-0
- Białostocki, Jan. "Reviewed Work: Tomb Sculpture by Erwin Panofsky". The Art Bulletin, volume 49, number 3, September 1967. JSTOR 3048476
- Nash, Susie. Northern Renaissance Art. Oxford: OUP Oxford, 2008. ISBN 978-0-1928-4269-5
