= Claus Sluter =

Dutch then Burgundian sculptor

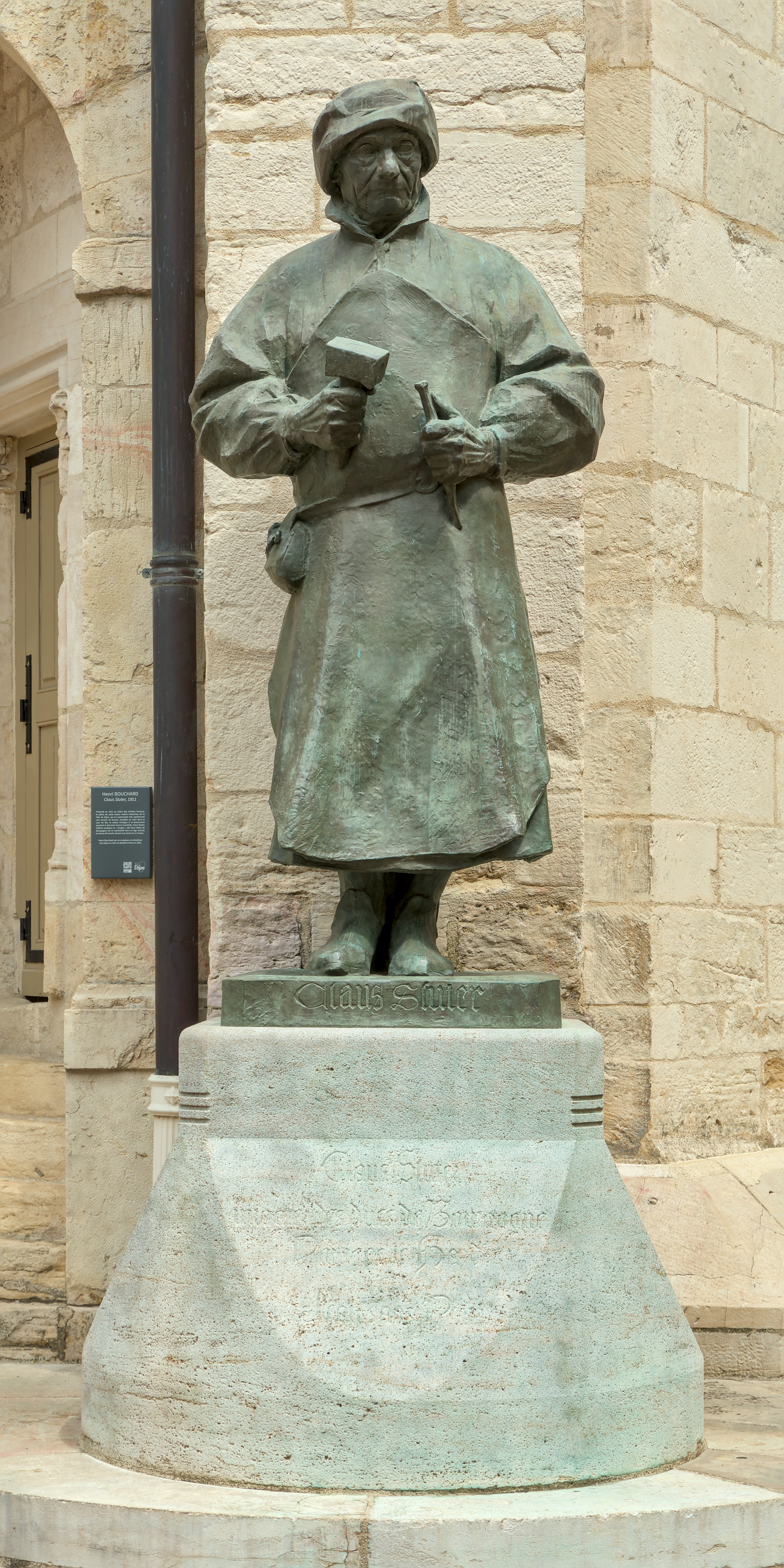
Statue of Claus Sluter in Dijon.

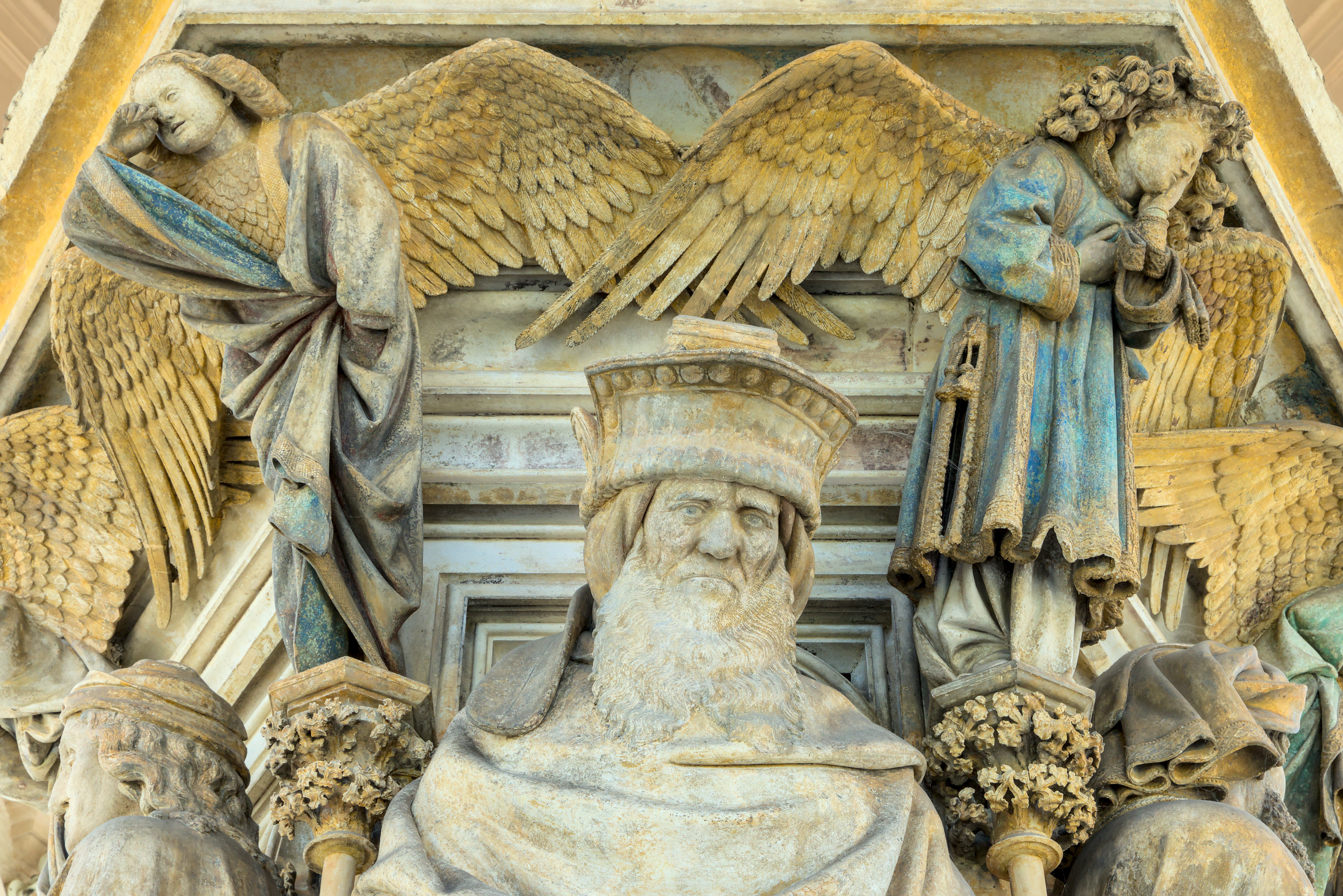
Zechariah and two mourning angels from the Well of Moses

Claus Sluter (1340s in Haarlem – 1405 or 1406 in Dijon) was a Dutch sculptor, living in the Duchy of Burgundy from about 1380. He was the most important northern European sculptor of his age and is considered a pioneer of the "northern realism" of the Early Netherlandish painting that came into full flower with the work of Jan van Eyck and others in the next generation.

== Life ==
The name "Claes de Slutere van Herlam" is inscribed in the Register of the Corporation of Stonemasons and Sculptors of Brussels around the years 1379/1380. He then moved to the Burgundian capital of Dijon, where from 1385 to 1389 he was the assistant of Jean de Marville, court sculptor to Philip the Bold, Duke of Burgundy. From 1389 to his death he was court sculptor himself, with the rank of valet de chambre. He was succeeded by his nephew Claus de Werve.

== Work ==
Sluter's most significant work is the so-called Well of Moses (1395–1403), or the Great Cross. It was created for the Carthusian monastery of Champmol, which was founded by Philip the Bold right outside Dijon in 1383. For many years, the top portion was thought to have included (along with Christ on a cross), sculptures of the Virgin and John the Evangelist. However it was more likely just Christ, with Mary Magdalene kneeling at the foot of the cross. The cross, and whatever was on the terrace below, was destroyed at some point after 1736 and before 1789, probable because the roof of the building protecting the monument collapsed. Some fragments from the original Cross are preserved in the Musée Archéologique de Dijon. Life-sized figures representing Old Testament prophets and kings (Moses, David, Daniel, Jeremiah, Zachariah, and Isaiah) stand around the base, holding phylacteries and books inscribed with verses from their respective texts, which were interpreted in the Middle Ages as typological prefigurations of the sacrifice of Christ. The work's physical structure, in which the Old Testament figures support those of the New Dispensation, literalizes the typological iconography. The pedestal surmounts a hexagonal fountain. The entire monument is executed in limestone quarried from Tonnerre and Asnières.

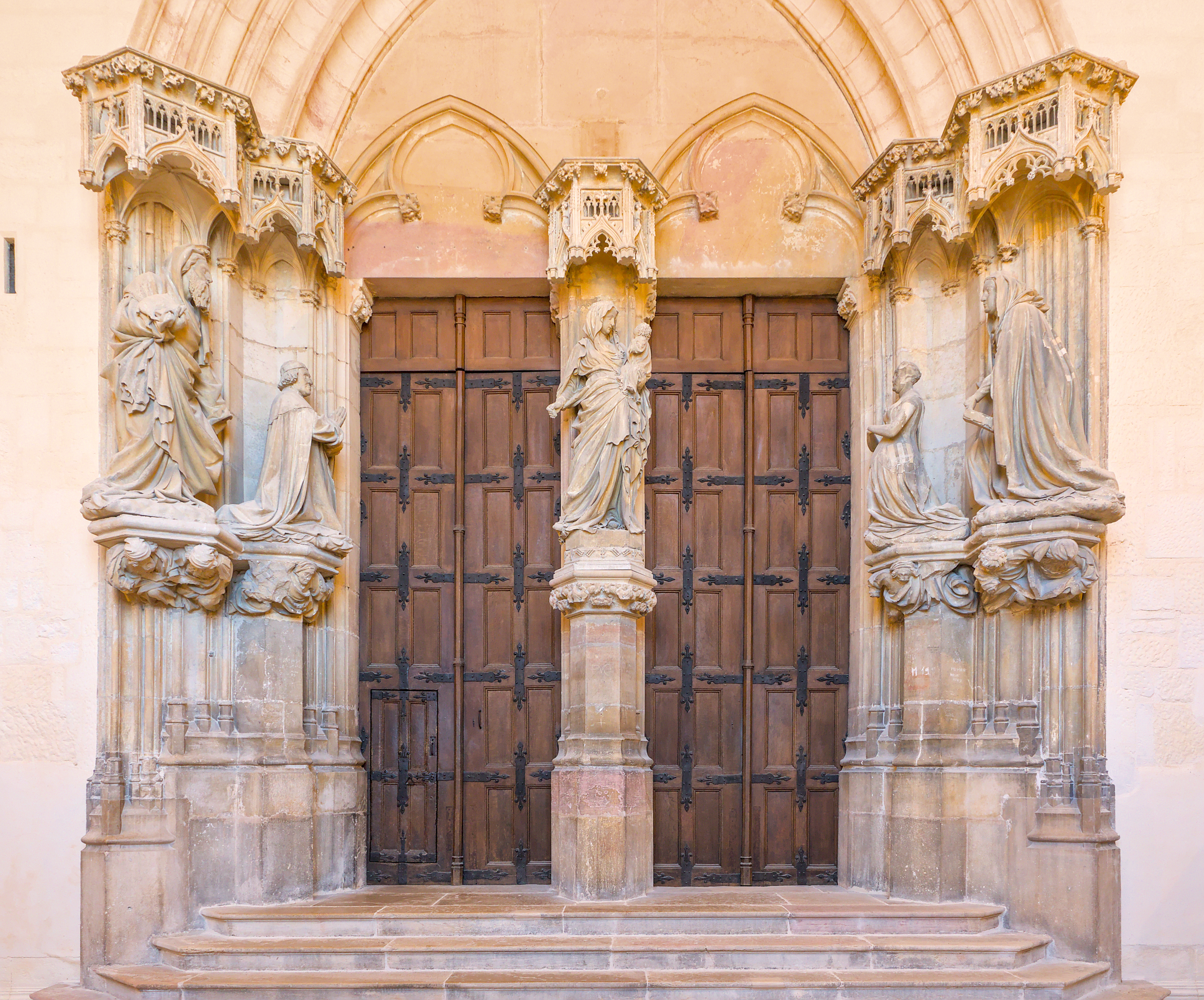
Monumental portal of the Chartreuse of Champmol at Dijon by Claus Sluter

The portal of the former mortuary chapel of Champmol is positioned a few feet away from the Well of Moses. It consists of three sculptural groups by Sluter: a standing Madonna and Child at the trumeau; the duke and St. John, his patron saint, at the left jamb and the duchess and her patron saint, Catherine, at the right one. Sluter was also responsible for the main part of the work on Philip's tomb, which (restored and partly reconstructed) has been moved to the Museum of Fine Arts which is housed in the former ducal palace in Dijon.

Sluter was one of the sculptors of the pleurants, or mourners, which occupy niches below the tombs of Philip the Bold, his wife Margaret, and John the Fearless.

== Sources ==
- Antoine, Elisabeth. Art from the Court of Burgundy: The Patronage of Philip the Bold and John the Fearless, 1364-1419. Seattle (WA): University of Washington, 2005. ISBN 978-2-7118-4864-5
- Jugie, Sophie. The Mourners: Tomb Sculpture from the Court of Burgundy . Paris: 1; First Edition, 2010. ISBN 978-0-3001-5517-4
- Nash, Susie. Northern Renaissance art. Oxford: Oxford University Press, 2008. ISBN 0-19-284269-2
- Kaldenbach, Kees. Web page on the Calvary sculpture, Rijksmuseum, 2021 https://johannesvermeer.info/sluter-calvary-rijksmuseum.
