= Susie Nash =

Susie Nash is the Deborah Loeb Brice Professor of Renaissance Art at the Courtauld Institute, London. After studying at the University of Reading (BA 1986, PhD 1993) she has been at the Courtauld. She is an expert on the art of the Northern Renaissance, specialising in Early Netherlandish painting and illuminated manuscripts and 15th century sculpture. Professor Nash is known for her work on the Chartreuse de Champmol in Dijon, and in particular the Great Cross, or Well of Moses, by Claus Sluter and Jean Malouel, published in a series of three articles in the Burlington Magazine. She is a founder member of the Research Centre for Illuminated Manuscripts and the Courtauld Sculptural Processes Study Group, and a Trustee of the Caroline Villers Research Fellowship.

== Selected publications ==
There is a fuller list here, with some available as PDFs.

- Trade in Artists' Materials. Markets and Commerce in Europe to 1700, co-editor with Jo Kirby and Joanna Cannon, Archetype Publications, London, 2010.
- Northern Renaissance Art, Oxford, Oxford University Press, 2008; part of the Oxford History of Art series.
- ‘Claus Sluter’s Well of Moses for the Chartreuse de Champmol reconsidered,’ Parts I, II and III, The Burlington Magazine, vol 147 (2005), pp. 798–809; vol. 148 (2006), pp. 456–467; vol. 150 (2008), pp. 724–741
- Between France and Flanders: Manuscript Illumination in Amiens in the Fifteenth Century, British Library Press and University of Toronto Press, London and Toronto, 1999.
- "The Lord’s Crucifix of Costly Workmanship: Colour, Collaboration and the Making of Meaning on the Well of Moses" in Circumlitio. The Polychromy of Antique and Late Medieval Sculpture, ed. V. Brinkmann, O. Primavesi and M. Hollein (Frankfurt am Main, 2010), pp. 356–381, full PDF
