= Tomb of Philippe Pot =

15th-century Burgundian nobleman's tomb

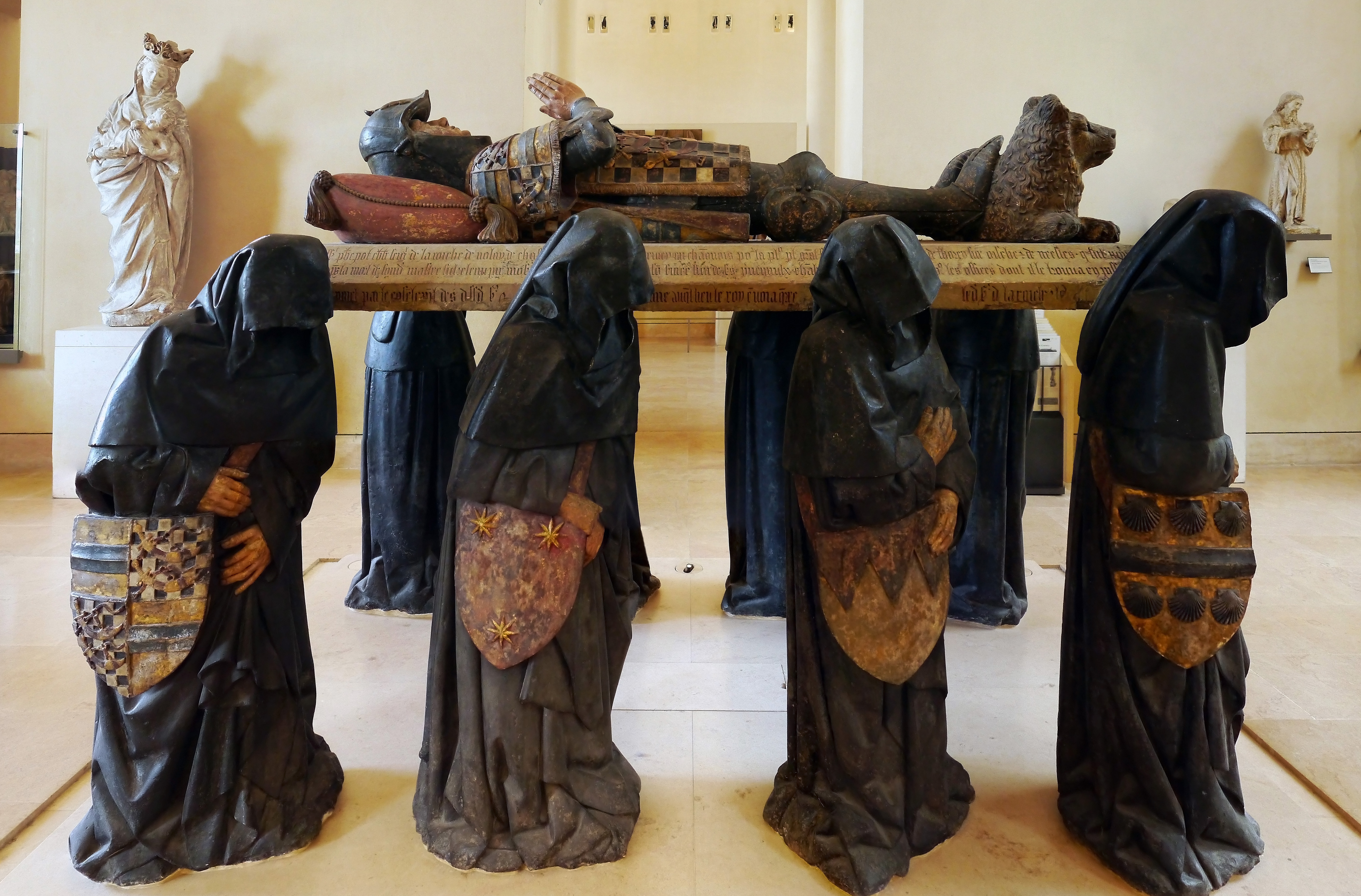
- Material: Limestone, paint, lead, gold
- Size: Height: 181 cm (71 in) Width: 260 cm (100 in) Depth: 167 cm (66 in); Each pleurant c. 135 cm (53 in) to 145 cm (57 in) high
- Created: c. 1480
- Period/culture: Northern Renaissance
- Present location: Louvre Museum, Paris
- Identification: RF 795

The tomb of Philippe Pot is a funerary monument in the Louvre in Paris. It was commissioned by the military leader and diplomat Philippe Pot around the year 1480 to be used for his burial at the chapel of Saint-Jean-Baptiste in Cîteaux Abbey, Dijon, France. His effigy shows him recumbent on a slab, his hands raised in prayer, and wearing armour and a heraldic tunic. The eight mourners (pleurants) are dressed in black hoods and act as pallbearers carrying him towards his grave. Pot commissioned the tomb when he was around 52 years old, 13 years before he died in 1493. The detailed inscriptions on the slab's sides emphasise his achievements and social standing.

Pot was a godson of Philip the Good and became a knight of the Golden Fleece. He served under two of the last Valois Dukes of Burgundy, Philip the Good and Charles the Bold. After the latter's defeat by René II, Duke of Lorraine at the Battle of Nancy in 1477, Pot switched allegiance to the French king, Louis XI, who appointed him grand seneschal of Burgundy. After the king died in 1483, Pot served under Louis's son, Charles VIII.

The individual figures are made of limestone, decorated with paint, gold, and lead. The monument is recorded as commissioned in 1480, but its designers or artisans are not mentioned. Art historians generally cite Antoine Le Moiturier as the most likely designer of the pleurants, based on circumstantial evidence, including similarities to others of his known works. The monument was seized during the French Revolution, and after changing hands several times, was placed in a private garden in Dijon in the 19th century. Since 1899, it has been in the Louvre Museum's collection and on permanent display. The piece underwent a major restoration between 2016 and 2018.

== Life and death of Philippe Pot ==
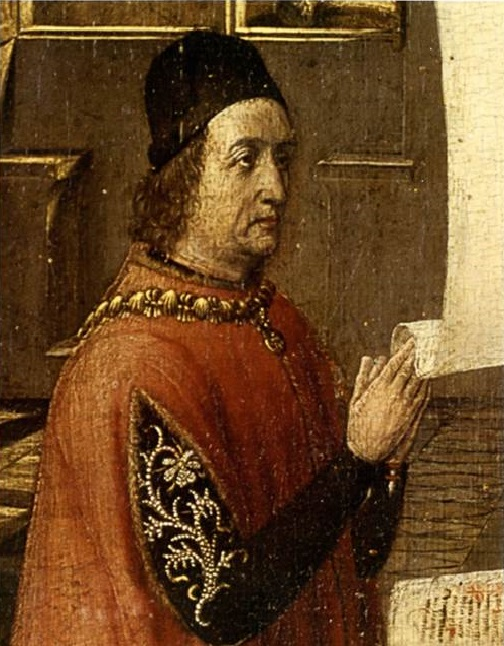
Unattributed donor portrait believed to be of Philippe Pot, Church of Notre-Dame of Dijon

Philippe Pot was born in 1428 at the Château de la Rochepot, outside Dijon in today's France. The region was then part of the Duchy of Burgundy and his father, Jacques, was an adviser and senior official to Duke Philip the Good. Pot was raised and educated at the Burgundian court. He was a scholar and bibliophile. He served during the politically fraught years of the last two Valois dukes of Burgundy, Philip the Good (r. 1419–1467) and Charles the Bold (r. 1467–1477). During this period, he rose to become a knight of the Golden Fleece and seigneur, or lord, of La Rochepot (his ancestral home) and Thorey-sur-Ouche in Burgundy. He was instrumental in arranging both Charles's betrothal to Catherine of France, and his second marriage, to Isabella of Bourbon.

Soon after Charles's defeat and death in January 1477 at the Battle of Nancy, Burgundy came under French control, and Pot seemingly changed allegiance to Louis XI, king of France (r. 1461–1483). Suspicious of his association with Louis, Charles and Isabella's daughter Mary of Burgundy expelled him from her realm and the court at Lille in June 1477. In disgrace, he fled to the then-French city of Tournai and was removed from the Order of the Golden Fleece in 1481.

He travelled in August 1477 on behalf of Louis to Lens in northern France to negotiate a truce with Mary and her husband and co-ruler, Maximilian of Austria. The ceasefire was signed on 8 September, and Louis eventually appointed him as grand seneschal of Burgundy. Following the king's death in 1483, Pot served under Louis' son Charles VIII (r. 1483–1498). Pot died in Dijon on 20 September 1493, aged around 65, having already made detailed plans for his burial place, funeral monument and epitaph.

== Commission ==
Plans for Pot's tomb first appear in the historical records on 28 August 1480, when Pot paid the abbot of Cîteaux Abbey, Jean de Cirey, one thousand livres for a burial place in the abbey's chapel of Saint-Jean-Baptiste. Although the dates of its construction are unknown, it is generally assumed to have been between 1480 and 1483 given that the inscriptions mention events after the January 1477 death of Charles the Bold, and mention Louis XI as king. Pot's motto "Tant L. vaut, était" (So much was he worth) was painted in several locations within the chapel. The floor of the Jean-Baptiste chapel is lined with rows of medieval burial plots, although few are marked. Pot's tomb was placed at the corner of the south arm of the chapel's transept. He was buried underneath his monument, located to the left of the altar.

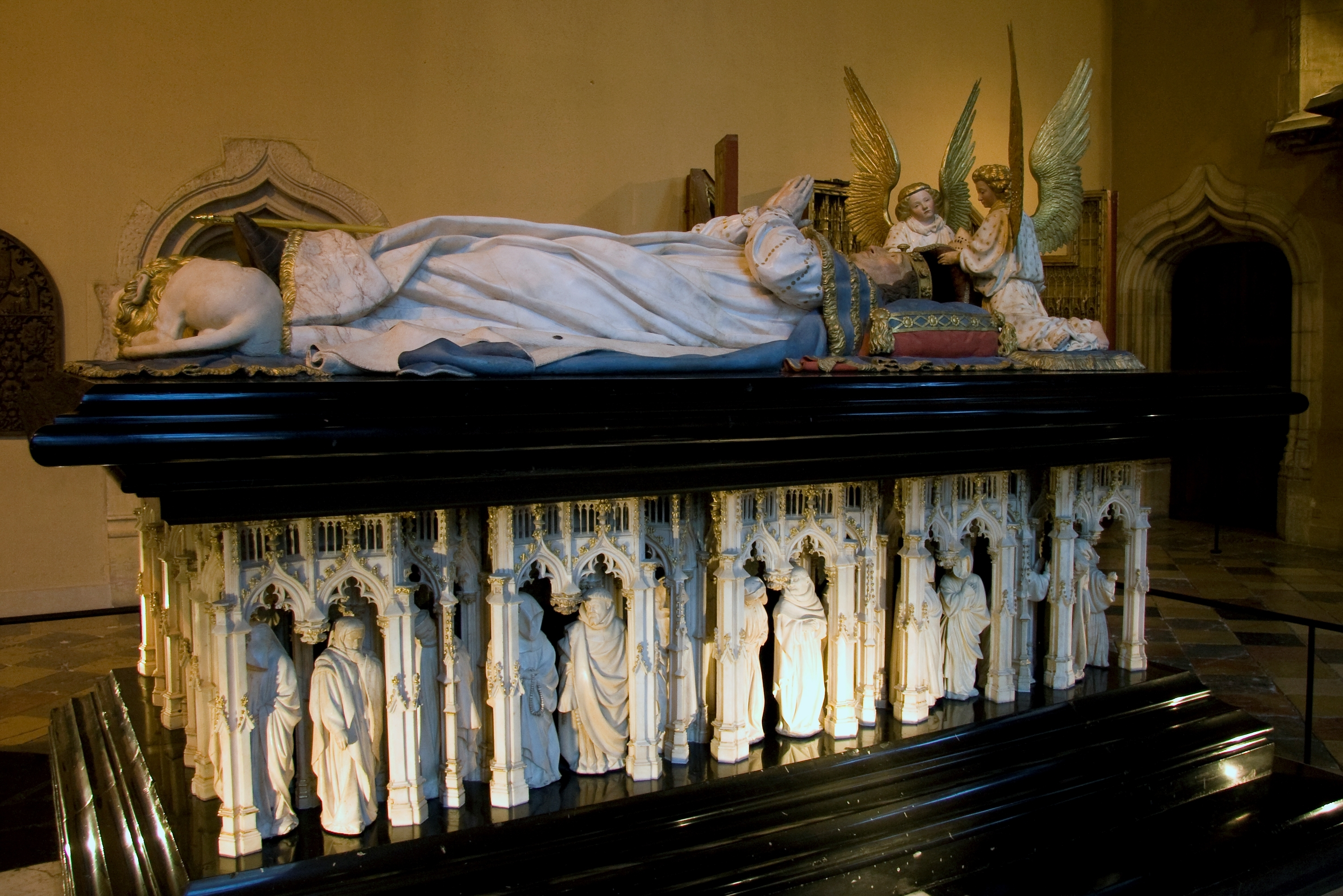
Tomb of Philip the Bold, built between 1381 and 1410

Pot's monument was one of the last of the Burgundian-style tombs, whose characteristics include the deceased having naturalised faces, open eyes and angels above their heads. The portrayal of the mourners (pleurants) is their defining motif. The style began with the tomb of Philip the Bold (d. 1404), built by the sculptors Jean de Marville (d. 1389) and Claus Sluter (d. 1405/6) from 1381, for the Chartreuse de Champmol, outside Dijon. Described by the art historian Frits Scholten as "one of the most magnificent tombs of the Late Middle Ages", its innovation was in transforming the mourners from the earlier static and unemotional figures to, according to the art historian John Moffitt, individualised weepers that "stumble forward in mutual anguish while praying in perpetuity for the late Duke's soul". This treatment was often copied and developed over the following century. By the time of Pot's commission the figures had become much larger – Sluter's have an average height of 40 cm (16 in) – and were free-standing rather than attached to the monument.

Pot commissioned his tomb some 13 years before he died, with his date of death left blank during construction; the current one was probably added in the 19th century. The tomb's extensive inscriptions indicate he wished to leave a record of his importance and prosperity, and to explain his change in allegiance to Louis XI. He probably first employed a painter to agree an overall design and then hired stonemasons, sculptors and craftsmen to construct the tomb.

== Description ==
=== Effigy ===
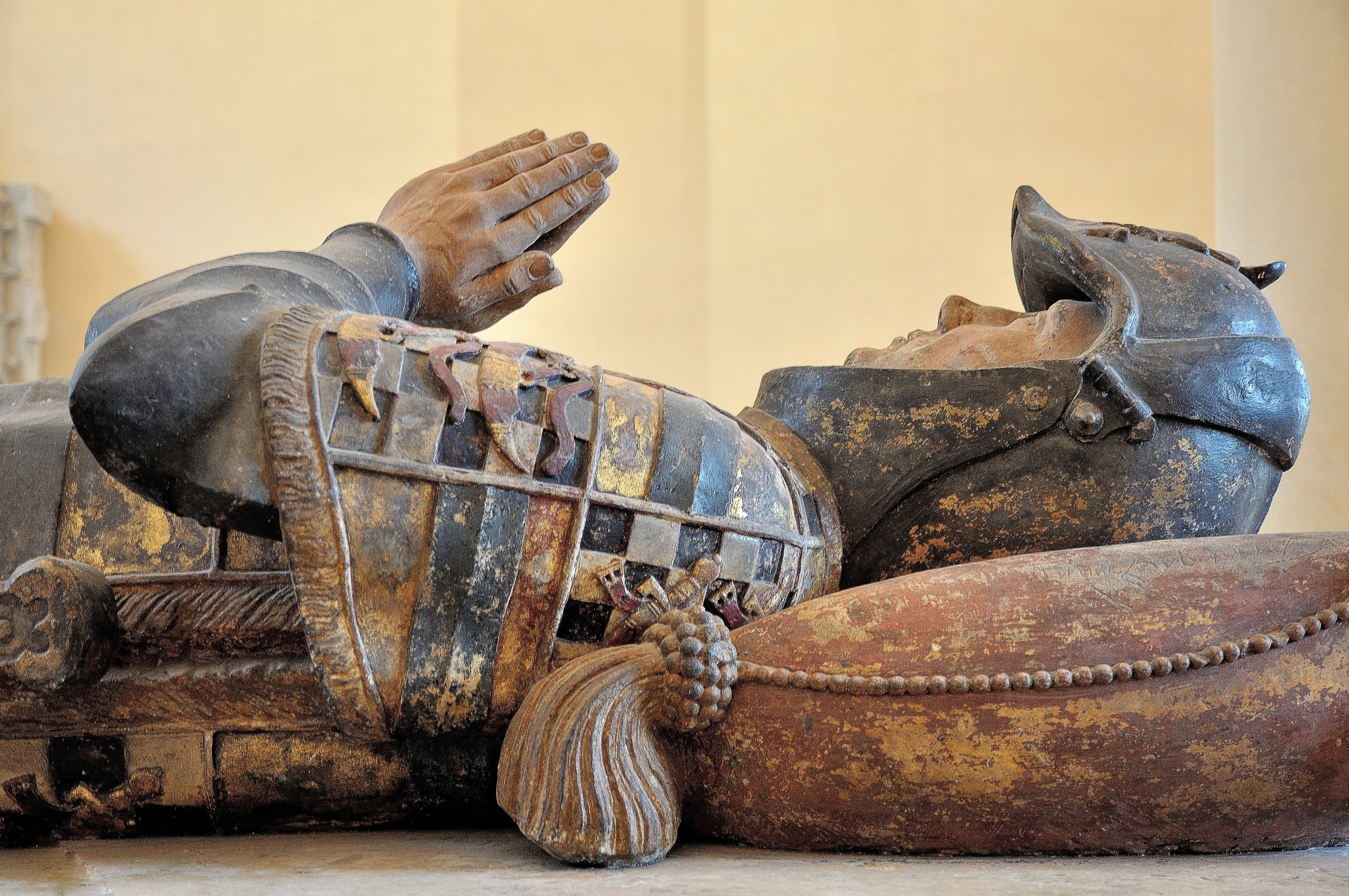
Detail of Pot's effigy with crest, helmet and pillow

The monument is made of limestone. Pot's effigy is carved in the round so it can be seen from all sides. His skin is painted in vermilion and lead white. His body rests on a slab, and his head is nested within a stone cushion. He is dressed in a tunic, silver armour decorated with a gilded breastplate, and a knight's helmet. Pot's eyes are open and his hands are clasped in prayer. A sword lies to his side and his feet rest on a brown animal of uncertain species; as a result of unsympathetic restoration of the animal and feet before the era of photography, art historians disagree whether the animal is a lion or a dog, and there are conflicting interpretations as to its iconography. Most see it as a dog – a traditional symbol of fidelity in Burgundian tomb art.

The coats of arms on his shield and on those of the mourners are painted in a variety of colours including gold, white, red, blue and black. They represent the insignia of his ancestral families of Pot, Courtiamble, Anguissola, Blaisy, Guénant, Nesles and Montagu. The effigy does not contain the angels often found in contemporary northern European tombs, guiding the deceased to the afterlife.

=== Pleurants ===
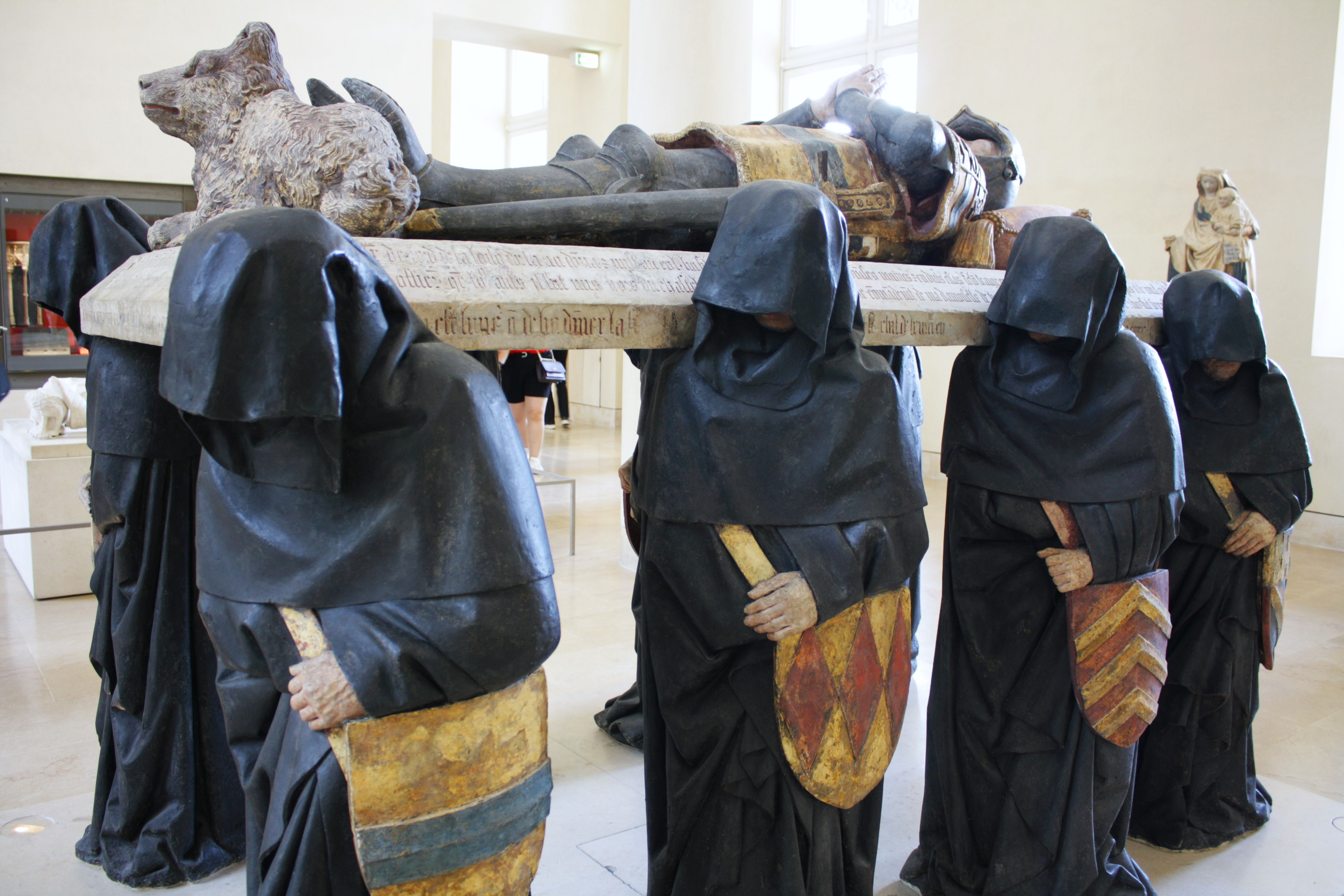
Mourners on the right-hand side

The eight mourners carrying Pot's slab were carved from limestone that was then polychromed in four shades of black paint (ranging from charcoal to pure black) for their robes and hoods. Their rigid forms and austere poses give the impression of the slow movement of a funeral procession. They range in height from 134 to 144 cm (53–57 in), slightly less than life-sized, allowing the recumbent figure to align with the viewer's line of sight. The full weight of the stone slab is supported by a narrow point on a shoulder of each figure, a feat described by the French art historian Sophie Jugie as "masterful ... in its technical audacity".

The mourners wear full-length black cloaks and shoulder-length hoods that mostly cover their faces. The hoods identify them as laity participating in a ceremonial burial rite often held in the region from the 13th to the 16th century. Although mourners with black hoods were not common in contemporary sculpture or painting, they can be found on works such as the mid-15th-century "Office of the Dead" miniature from Jean Fouquet's illuminated manuscript the "Hours of Étienne Chevalier". Each bears a painted and gilded heraldic shield that refers to specific members of Pot's lineage, indicating the monument is of the "kinship tomb" type. The four shields on the left represent the heraldries of Guillaume III Pot (d. c. 1390) and Raguenonde Guénant, the Cortiambles family, the Anguissola family, and the de Blaisy family. Those on the left represent the de Montagus and de Nesles, and two unidentified families.

Although their faces are mostly covered and thus do not have individualised features, the mourners have different poses, heraldic shields and folded drapes. The clothing contains deep, angular folds, and seems influenced by the works of the mid-15th-century Early Netherlandish painters such as Rogier van der Weyden (d. 1464). Other potential influences include the relief of four monks with covered heads on a short side of the tomb of Pierre de Bauffremont (d. 1472), commissioned in 1453 for his planned burial in Dijon, and a near-contemporary tomb in Semur-en-Auxois that was likely known to Philippe.

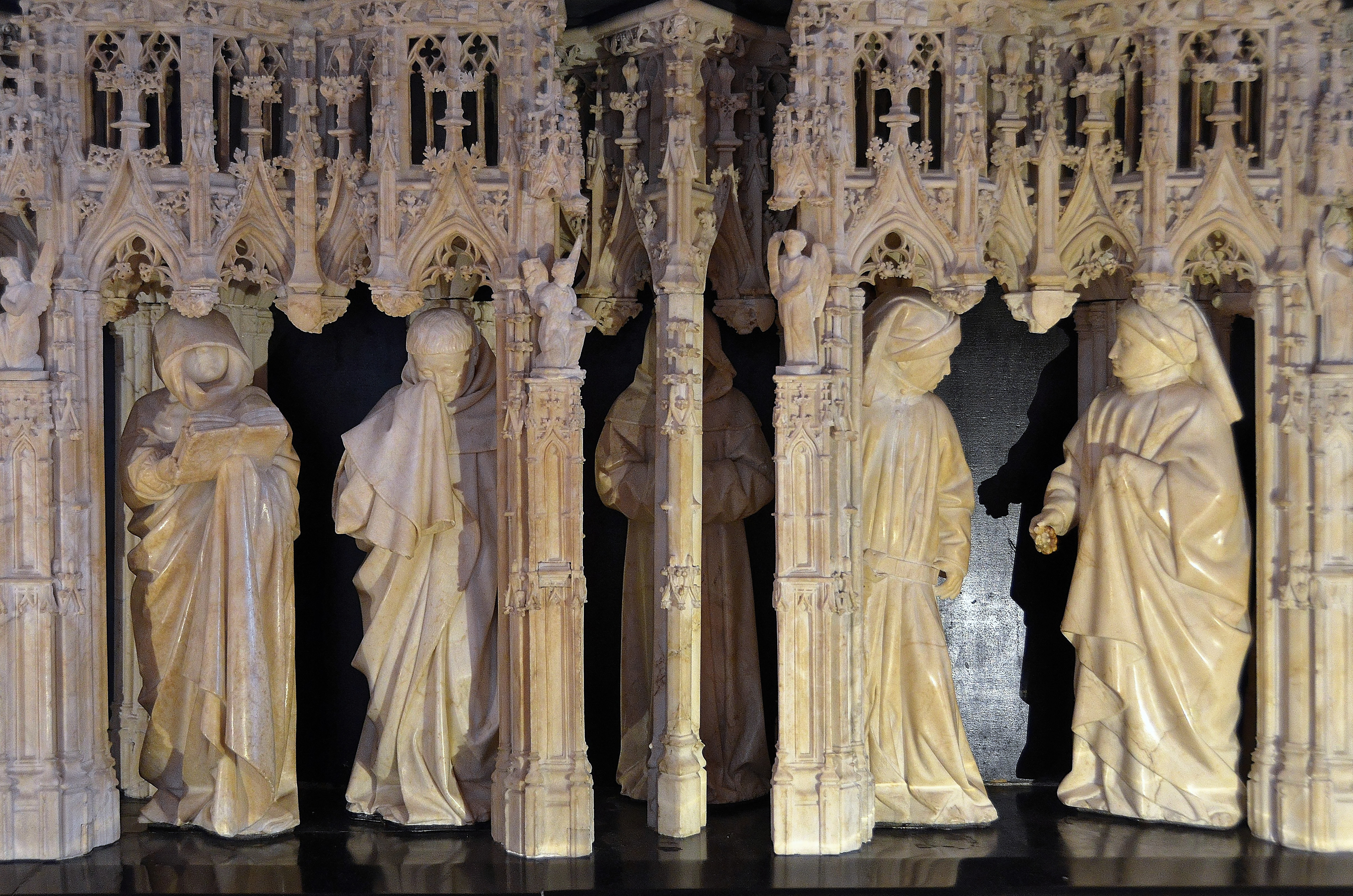
Mourners in a niche, tomb of John the Fearless, attributed to the Spanish sculptor Jean de la Huerta, c. 1406

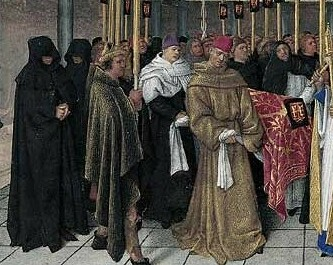
Office of the Dead from the Hours of Étienne Chevalier, Jean Fouquet, c. 1452–1460

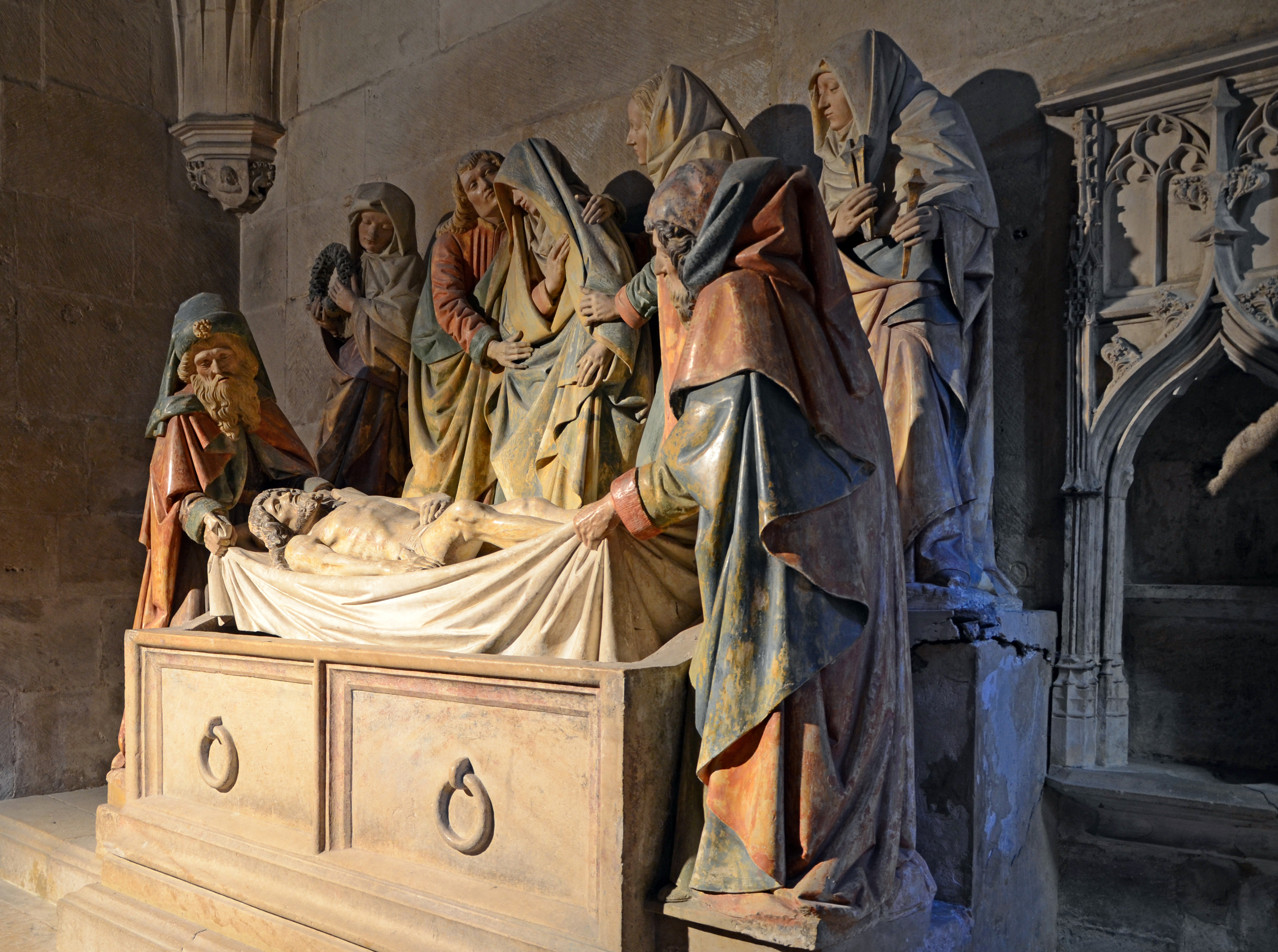
Entombment, attributed to Antoine Le Moiturier, 1490. Notre-Dame Collegiate Church of Semur-en-Auxois.

=== Inscriptions ===
The extensive carved inscriptions on the edges of the slab are in Gothic script. They are written in three rows, each beginning on the right side of the head of the effigy and ending behind his head on the opposite side. The text outlines his career with Philip the Good and Charles the Bold, as well as his reasons for switching sides to serve under Louis XI and Charles VIII following the Burgundian's 1477 defeat at Nancy. Most of the text was written before Pot's death. His year of death is erroneously recorded as l'an mil ccccxci[v] ("in the year 149[4]").

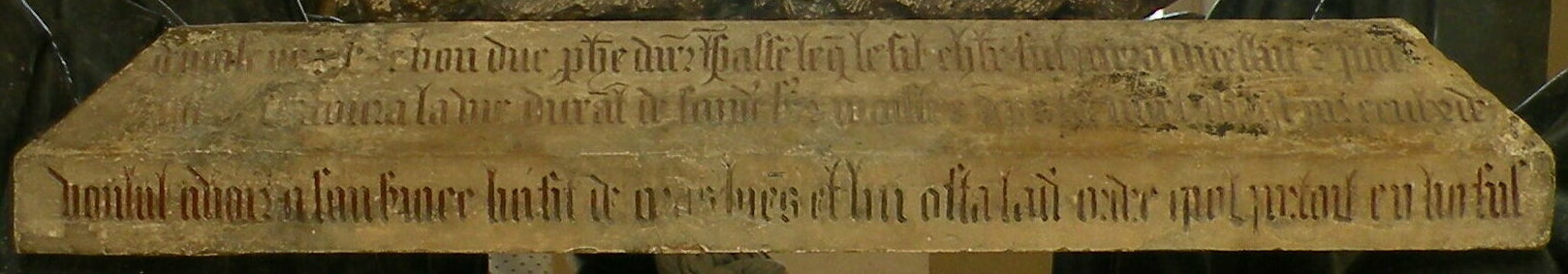
Inscriptions on a side of the slab

== Attribution ==
Art historians have not identified the artists or craftsmen responsible for designing and building the tomb. Antoine Le Moiturier (d. 1495) is often suggested as likely to have designed the pleurants, given the similarity of the solid and rigid rendering of their clothing to the Mourners of Dijon which are often attributed to him. Guillaume Chandelier, a painter active in Dijon at the time, has been suggested as involved, although with little supporting evidence.

Art historians generally distinguish between the conventional design of the effigy, the expressive form of the mourners, and the inventive placing of the slab on narrow points above each of their shoulders. While it is possible that a single artist, who was both a painter and sculptor, oversaw the tomb's completion, the variation in the quality of sculpture indicates several hands. The art historian Robert Marcoux notes variabilities in skill, and believes that parts of the sculpture are so sparsely detailed that they were likely completed by workshop members.

== Provenance ==
The monument passed through several owners and locations over the centuries, and its complex history was only fully pieced together in the mid-20th century. It was mentioned in 1649 by Pierre Palliot, a bookseller and printer in Dijon, when he described the coats of arms and the inscriptions. The antiquarian and collector François Roger de Gaignières (d. 1715) made drawings of the tomb between 1699 and 1700, which are lost and known only from copies by the artist Louis Boudan (fl. 1687–1709); these are uninformative as they contain inaccuracies. The tomb was nationalised during the early years of the French Revolution when the state took ownership of all church property.

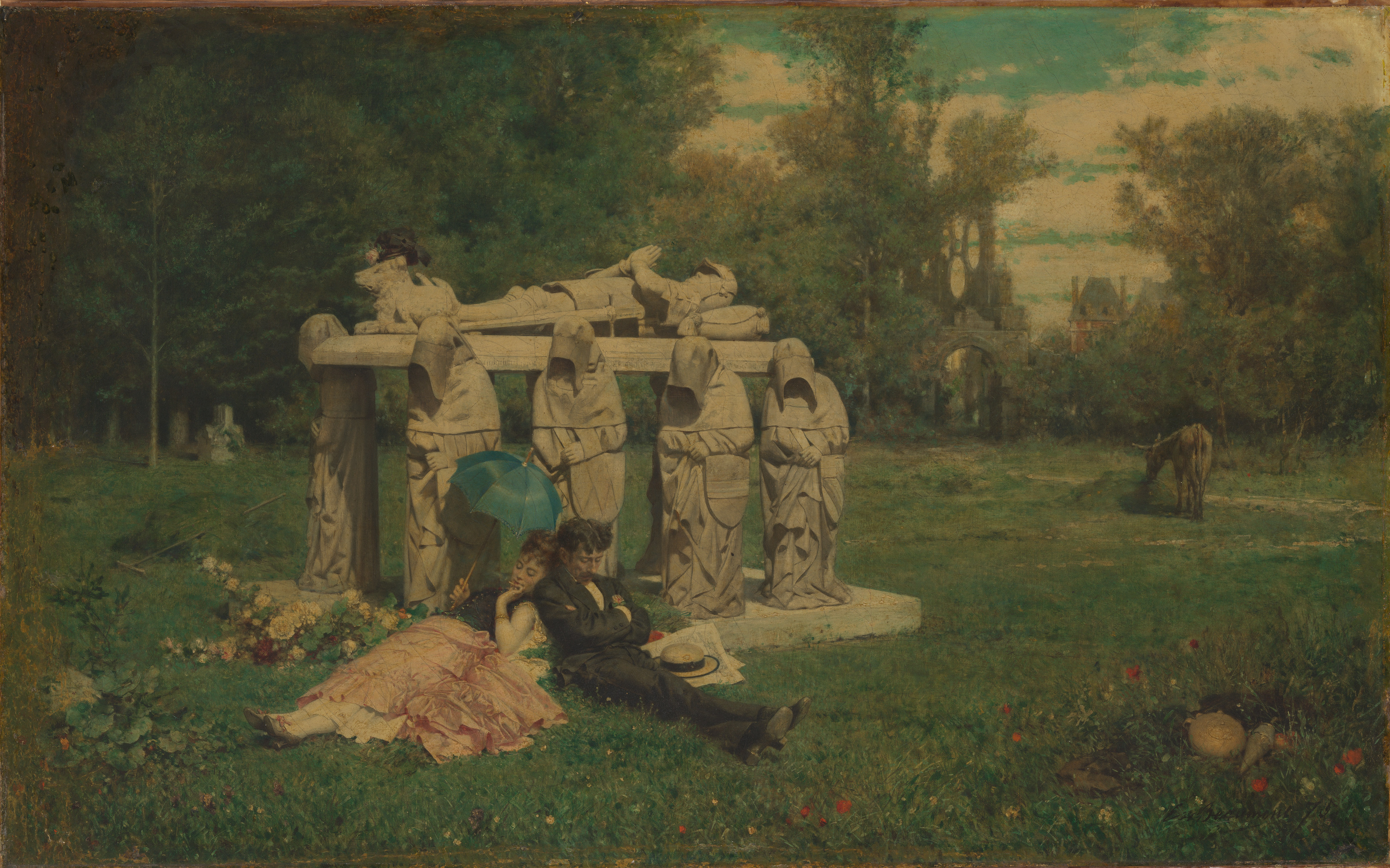
Charles Édouard de Beaumont, Au Soleil, 1875. Metropolitan Museum of Art, New York.

Sometime between 1791 and 1793 François Devosge, an artist and director of the Dijon School of Drawing, was employed to relocate it to the Benedictine abbey in Saint-Bénigne. It was next mentioned in September 1808 when it was acquired for fifty-three livres by Count Richard de Vesvrotte, following a legal case against the French state. He placed it under trees in the garden of his hôtel particulier (townhouse), the Hôtel de Ruffey at 33 rue Berbisey in Dijon.

Richard's son Pierre sold the townhouse in 1850 and relocated the tomb to the Château de Vesvrotte in Beire-le-Châtel, Côte-d'Or, where it was again placed in an outdoor garden. It was photographed for the first time in a series of photolithographs commissioned by Pierre's son Alphonse Richard de Vesvrotte. They were published in 1863, and inspired the artist, antiquarian and collector Charles Édouard de Beaumont's 1875 painting Au soleil (or At the Tomb of Philippe Pot), which shows a couple lying at the foot of the tomb in a meadow surrounded by trees.

The Vesvrotte family attempted to sell the tomb after Richard's death in 1873. The French state sought to block the sale, claiming it was by now public property, a claim eventually rejected in 1886 by a Dijon court who gave full ownership to Pierre's son, Armand de Vesvrotte. It was nationalised by the French state that August on the grounds that it was an "object of national historical importance". It was acquired for the Louvre in 1889 by the intermediator Charles Mannheim.

== Condition and restorations ==
The tomb was cleaned and restored several times in the 19th century, as evidenced by comparison to earlier reproductions, such as an engraving that shows Pot's fingers as being badly damaged. Early drawings show his feet and the animal in very poor condition until c. 1816. Some of the letters and words on the inscription were restored before 1880 by the archivist Jean-Baptiste Peincedé. The tomb underwent a major restoration between 2018 and 2019 in a project led by Sophie Jugie, who was then director of the Department of Sculptures at the Louvre. It had been in poor condition, covered by accumulated layers of brown dirt around the heraldry, and had layers of gloss and polyvinyl alcohol from earlier cleanings. The restoration was preceded by an in-depth technical analysis conducted between 2016 and 2017 by the Centre for Research and Restoration of Museums of France. Surface layers of bleach, gloss and brown fouling of the blazons were taken off, the unpainted stone was cleaned, and additions from earlier restorations were removed.

== Imitations and replicas ==
The monument had a significant influence on later funerary tombs. It transformed the conventional size and placement of pleurants, which previously had mostly been relatively small figures standing in niches. The motif of eight mourners carrying an effigy's slab can be seen on the tombs of Louis de Savoisy (d. 1515) and Jacques de Mâlain (d. 1527). The tomb was photographed several times in the mid-19th century before it was acquired by the Louvre.

In 2010 the American sculptor Matthew Day Jackson exhibited The Tomb, a wood and plastic installation showing astronauts carrying a glass box containing a human skeleton.

== Sources ==
- Chabeuf, Henri. Jean de La Huerta, Antoine Le Moiturier et le tombeau de Jean sans Peur, Dijon. Paris: Darantière, 1891. Republished: West Columbia, TX: Wentworth Press, 2018. ISBN 978-0-3414-5950-7.
- Hofstatter, Hans. Art of the Middle Ages. New York: Harry N. Abrams, 1968.
- Hourihane, Colum. The Grove Encyclopedia of Medieval Art and Architecture, Vol. 1. Oxford: Oxford University Press, 2012. ISBN 978-0-1953-9536-5.
- Jugie, Sophie. Le Tombeau de Philippe Pot. Paris: Ediciones El Viso, 2019. ISBN 978-8-4948-2447-0.
- Jugie, Sophie. The Mourners: Tomb Sculpture from the Court of Burgundy. New Haven, CT: Yale University Press, 2010. ISBN 978-0-3001-5517-4.
- Kiening, Christian. "Rhétorique de la perte. L'exemple de la mort d'Isabelle de Bourbon (1465)". Médiévales, no. 27, 1994. JSTOR 43026850.
- Marcoux, Robert. Le tombeau de Philippe Pot: analyse et interprétation. Montréal: Université de Montréal, 2003
- McGee Morganstern, Ann. "Gothic Tombs of Kinship in France, the Low Countries, and England". University Park: Pennsylvania State University Press, 2000. ISBN 978-0-2710-1859-1.
- Mikolic, Amanda. "Fashionable Mourners: Bronze Statuettes from the Rijksmuseum" (exhibition catalogue). Cleveland, OH: Cleveland Museum of Art, 2017
- Moffitt, John. "Sluter's 'Pleurants' and Timanthes' 'Tristitia Velata': Evolution of, and Sources for a Humanist Topos of Mourning". Artibus et Historiae, volume 26, no. 51, 2005. JSTOR 1483776.
- Nash, Susie. Northern Renaissance Art. Oxford: Oxford University Press, 2008. ISBN 978-0-1928-4269-5.
- Panofsky, Erwin; Panofsky, Gerda. "The Tomb in Arcady at the Fin-de-Siècle". Wallraf-Richartz-Jahrbuch, vol. 30, 1968. JSTOR 24655959.
- Panofsky, Erwin. Tomb Sculpture: Its Changing Aspects from Ancient Egypt to Bernini. London: Harry Abrams, 1964. ISBN 978-0-8109-3870-0.
- Sadler, Donna. Stone, Flesh, Spirit: The Entombment of Christ in Late Medieval Burgundy. Boston: Brill Academic, 2015. ISBN 978-9-0042-9314-4.
- Scholten, Frits. "Isabella's Weepers: Ten Statues from a Burgundian Tomb". Amsterdam: Rijksmuseum, 2007. ISBN 978-9-07145-0822.
- Sterling, Charles; Salinger, Margaretta. French Paintings: A Catalogue of the Collection of The Metropolitan Museum of Art. New York: Metropolitan Museum of Art, 1966
- Vaughan, Richard; Paravicini, Werner. Charles the Bold: The Last Valois Duke of Burgundy. London: Barnes & Noble, 1973. ISBN 978-0-0649-7171-3.
