= Philippe Pot =

Burgundian nobleman (1428–1493)

- Seigneur of La Roche and Thorey-sur-Ouche
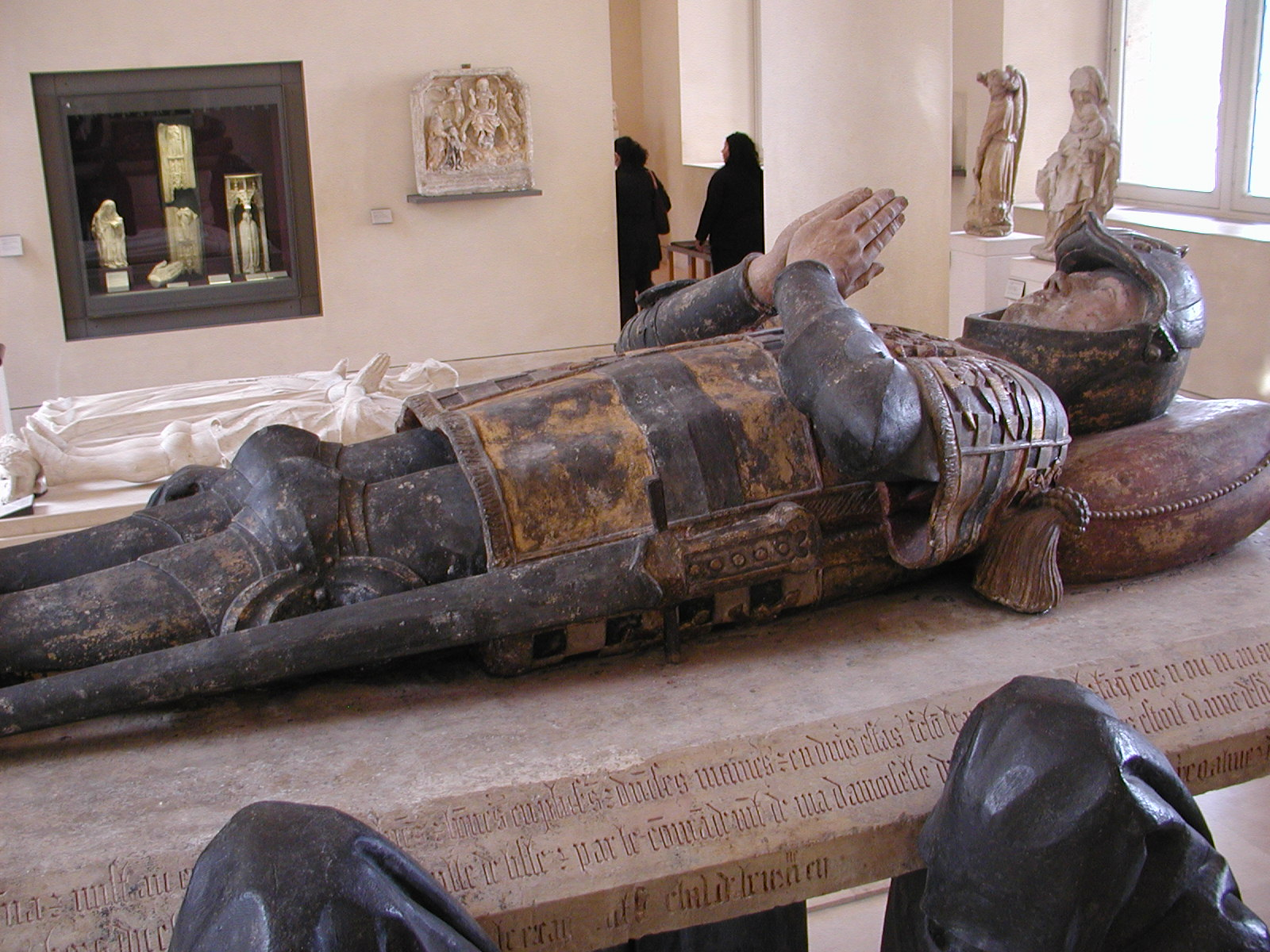
- The effigy on Pot's tomb, which was built for Cîteaux, and is now in the Louvre, Paris

Grand Seneschal of Burgundy
- In office 1482–1493
- Monarchs: Louis XI; Charles VIII
- Born: 1428; Château de la Rochepot
- Died: 1493 (aged 64–65)

Philippe Pot (1428–1493) was a Burgundian nobleman, military leader, and diplomat. He was the seigneur of La Roche and Thorey-sur-Ouche, a Knight of the Golden Fleece, and the Grand Seneschal of Burgundy.

== Life ==
Born in 1428 at the Château de la Rochepot, he was the grandson of Régnier Pot, a Crusader, knight of the Golden Fleece, and the chamberlain of Philip the Bold, Duke of Burgundy. Philip's grandson and heir, Philip the Good, served as Philippe's godfather. Educated at the ducal court in Dijon, and knighted 11 June 1452 before the battle of Ruppelmonde against the insurgents of Ghent, Philippe, praised by contemporary chroniclers, became chief advisor of the dukes of Burgundy and was deeply involved in all their diplomacy.

Philippe was sent by Philip the Good as an ambassador to London in 1440, where he procured the release of Charles of Orléans, a prisoner since 1415 and the cousin of Charles VII of France, for 200,000 écus d'or. Charles in turn agreed to marry Mary of Cleves, Philip's niece.

In 1446, he obtained the hand in marriage of Catherine of Valois for the Count of Charolais, the future Duke of Burgundy, Charles the Bold. When Catherine died in 1450, Philippe obtained another French princess, Isabelle of Bourbon, for Charles. The marriage took place in 1454. In December 1456 Duke Philip recompensed Philippe with the grant of Châteauneuf-en-Auxois (which Philippe restored and fortified, giving it the appearance it retains today) and in May 1461, with the Golden Fleece at the Saint-Omer session.

In 1464 he was granted the title Grand Chamberlain, and in 1466 was given the lordship of Walloon Flanders (Lille, Douai, and Orchies). After the deaths in 1467 of both Philip the Good and Isabelle of Bourbon, Philippe Pot negotiated a third match for his new patron Charles the Bold with Margaret of York, a union which had been opposed by Philip. In 1468 the marriage sealed an alliance between England and Burgundy. To have Philippe nearby him at Brussels Charles gave him the hôtel of the comte de Nevers.

When Charles the Bold died in 1477, Burgundy was divided between his daughter, Mary, heiress to the Burgundian Netherlands, and Louis XI of France, legitimate heir to the Duchy of Burgundy proper. Mary was suspicious of Philippe and his close connections with the French court, and she confiscated Lille. With the support of the Burgundian baronage Philippe was able to limit the holdings of Mary and her husband, Maximilian, to the Burgundian Low Countries by another Treaty of Arras. In gratitude Louis XI named him first counsellor, knight of Saint Michael, governor of the Dauphin Charles, and Grand Seneschal of Burgundy. His treatment of Philippe went a long way to restore Louis's favour with the petty nobles of Burgundy.

Louis died in 1483, while Charles VIII was still a minor. The great nobles of the kingdom, first among them Louis of Orléans, contested the regency with the dead king's nominee, Anne de Beaujeu, Charles' elder sister. In 1484 she convened the Estates General at Tours. Philippe was the representative of the nobility and he spoke so eloquently in their favour that he was called the "mouth of Cicero" (bouche de Cicéron).

In his most celebrated speech to the Estates General, on 9 February 1484, Philippe challenged the right of the princes to govern and advanced instead the concept of a nation represented by a monarch, and suggested that the nation be governed by regency council. The deputies then voted to accept the choice of the king and declared Anne regent. The incipient nationalism in Philippe's speech, however, frightened the regent; the Estates were quickly dissolved. Philippe was allowed to keep his function of governor of Burgundy, which he held, reconfirmed by Charles VIII, until his death in 1493.

== See also ==
- Tomb of Philippe Pot

== Sources ==
- Armstrong, Charles Arthur John. "The Burgundian Netherlands, 1477-1521", in: Potter, George Richard (ed), The New Cambridge Modern History volume I. Cambridge: Cambridge University Press, 1957. ISBN 978-0-5210-4541-4
- Jugie, Sophie. Le Tombeau de Philippe Pot. Paris: Ediciones El Viso, 2019. ISBN 978-8-4948-2447-0
- Scholten, Frits. "Isabella’s Weepers: Ten Statues from a Burgundian Tomb"'. Amsterdam: Rijksmuseum, 2007. ISBN 978-9-07145-0822
- Vaughan, Richard; Paravicini, Werner. Charles the Bold: The Last Valois Duke of Burgundy. London: Barnes & Noble, 1973. ISBN 978-0-0649-7171-3
