= Château de Châteauneuf =

15th-century fortress in Châteauneuf in the Côte-d'Or département of France

Coordinates: 47°13′2″N 4°38′24″E

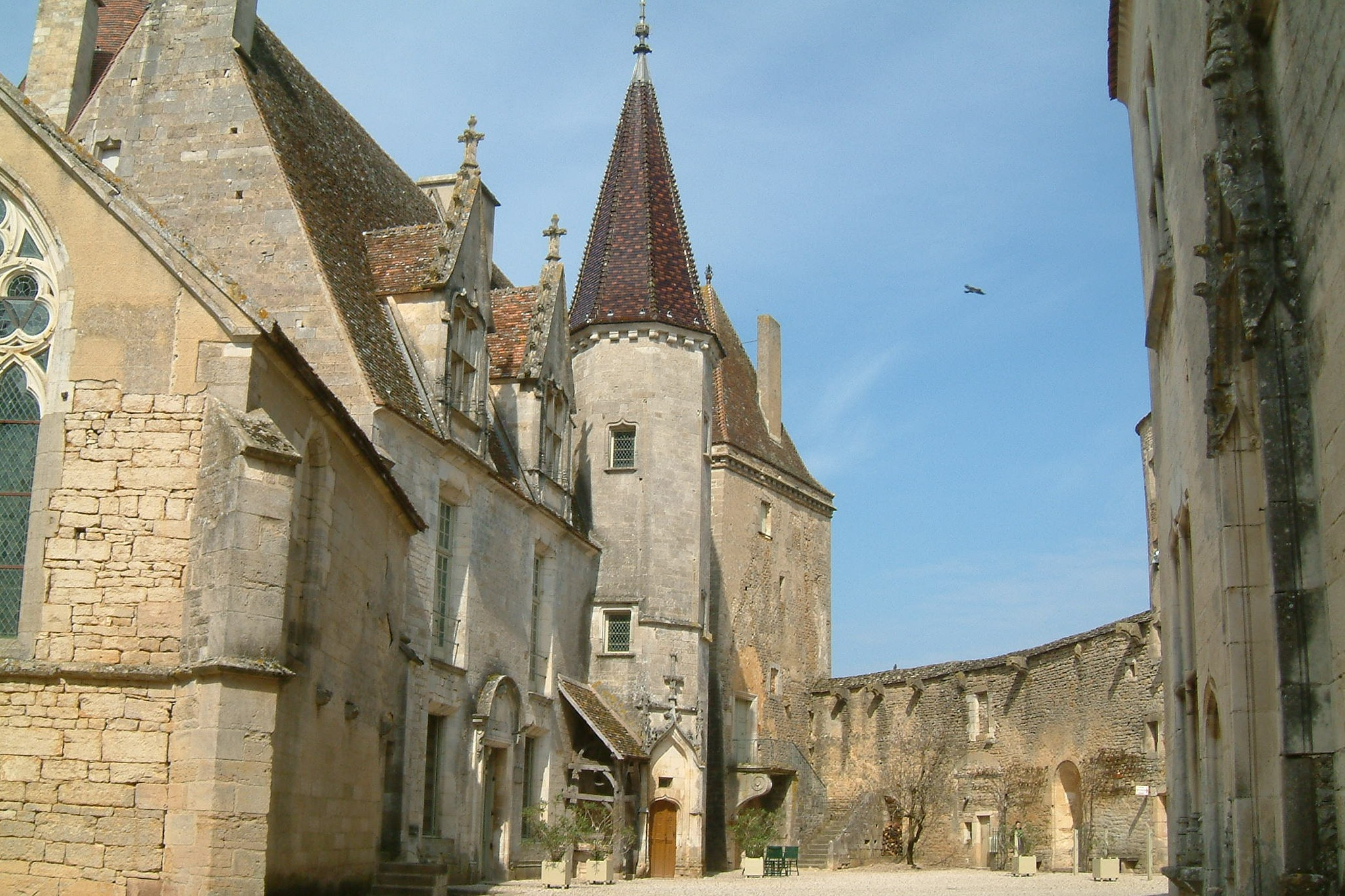
The Château de Châteauneuf, view from the bailey

The Château de Châteauneuf, also known as the Château de Châteauneuf-en-Auxois, is a 15th-century fortress in the commune of Châteauneuf, 43 km from Dijon, in the Côte-d'Or département of France. It is a vast stone building, 75 metres in length and 35 metres broad, situated on a rocky outcrop 475 metres above the surrounding plains. It dominates the valley of Canal de Bourgogne.

== History ==
The castle was built in 1132 by Jean de Chaudenay for his son Jehan, who took possession of it in 1175 and became Jean I de Châteauneuf. Facing the threat of the Hundred Years' War, the lords of Châteauneuf then built the powerful fortifications around the 12th century keep. After nine generations in the castle, the reign of the Châteauneufs ended in tragedy when in 1456 the last heiress, Catherine de Châteauneuf, was burnt alive for poisoning her second husband, Jacques d'Haussonville.

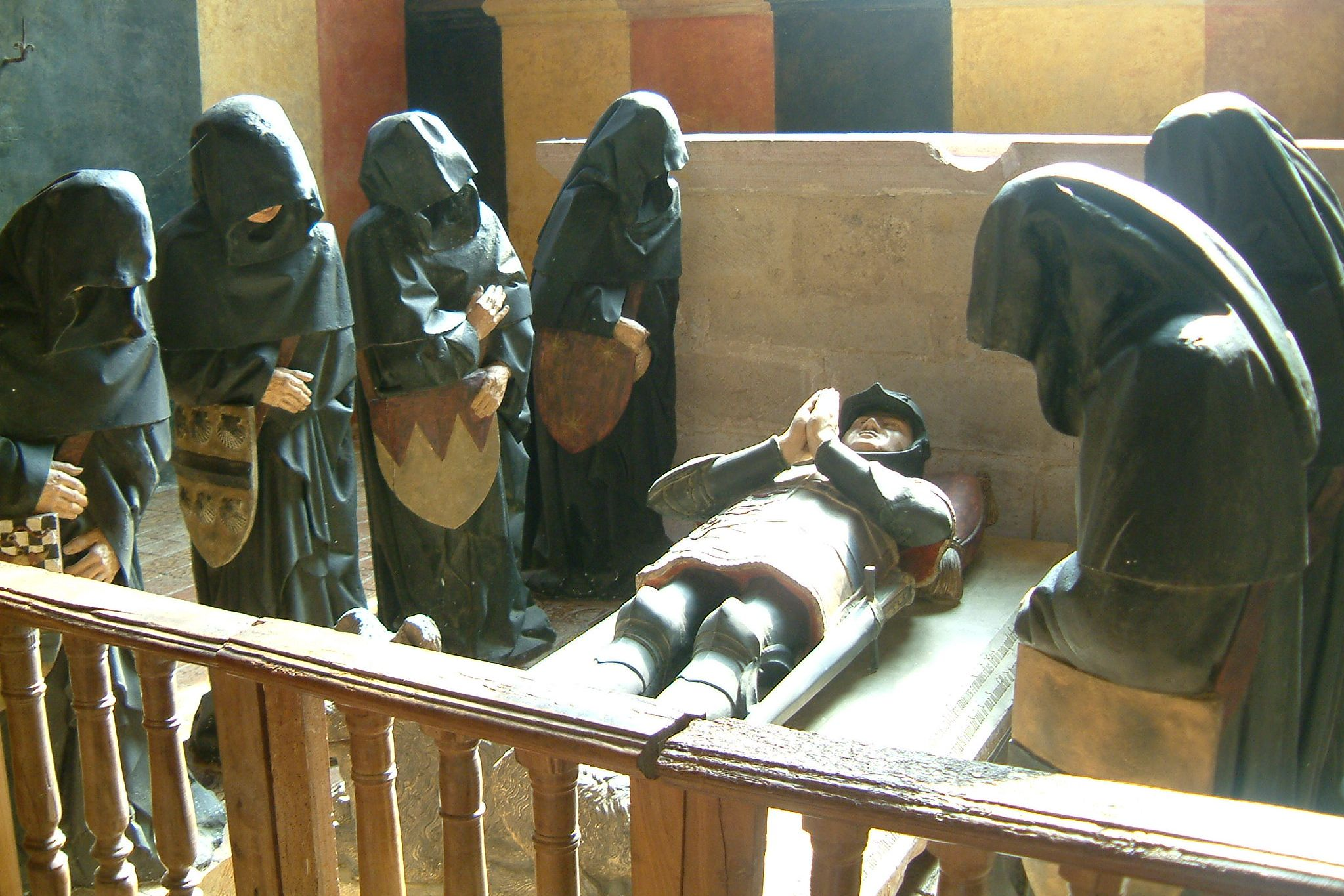
View of Philippe Pot's tomb

In 1457, Philippe le Bon, duke of Burgundy, offered the fortress to his advisor Philippe Pot, also of the Order of the Golden Fleece (French: ĺ'Ordre de la Toison d'or) and a knight of Saint Michael. He then modified the castle to make it more comfortable as a residence, in keeping with the style of the court of the Duchy of Burgundy. A chapel and a residence dated to this time were built out in the court of the castle, in the flamboyant Gothic architectural style. At multiple places in the castle one can find the device of Philippe Pot, « Tant L Valt ».

Philippe died in 1493 without leaving an heir, so the castle went to his brother Guy Pot, then via various alliances to Marie Liesse de Luxembourg. With their entrance into the convent, the castle then passed to Charles de Vienne, count of Comarrin, and remained in the hands of this family for the next 150 years. In 1767, Louis Henri de Vienne sold the castle to a rich banker.

During the French Revolution, all royal symbols and armorial bearings were defaced or destroyed. The castle was then auctioned and passed through various hands until 1936, when the count George de Vogue donated it to the state and Châteauneuf and its neighbouring village were declared as protected historical monuments (French: monument historique).

== Architecture ==
The Château de Châteauneuf is a vast stone building, 75 metres in length and 35 metres broad.

Over centuries, it has undergone different projects. In the 13th century, a chapel was built. In the 14th and 15th centuries, a powerful wall and 5 defensive towers were added. Around 1460, owner Philippe Pot, rebuilt the fortress and refurbished the chapel. A mantlepiece over the Great Hall's fireplace still bears his moto "Tant L Vault" dedicated to the Virgin Mary. Restoration projects have continued, most notably in 2008 by the Burgundy-Franche-Comté Region. From 2022 to 2024, a restoration project commenced including a new reception area and shop, disabled access, opening of new museum areas, and a landscaping project.

== See also ==
- List of castles in France
