= Châteauneuf, Côte-d'Or =

Châteauneuf
- Commune
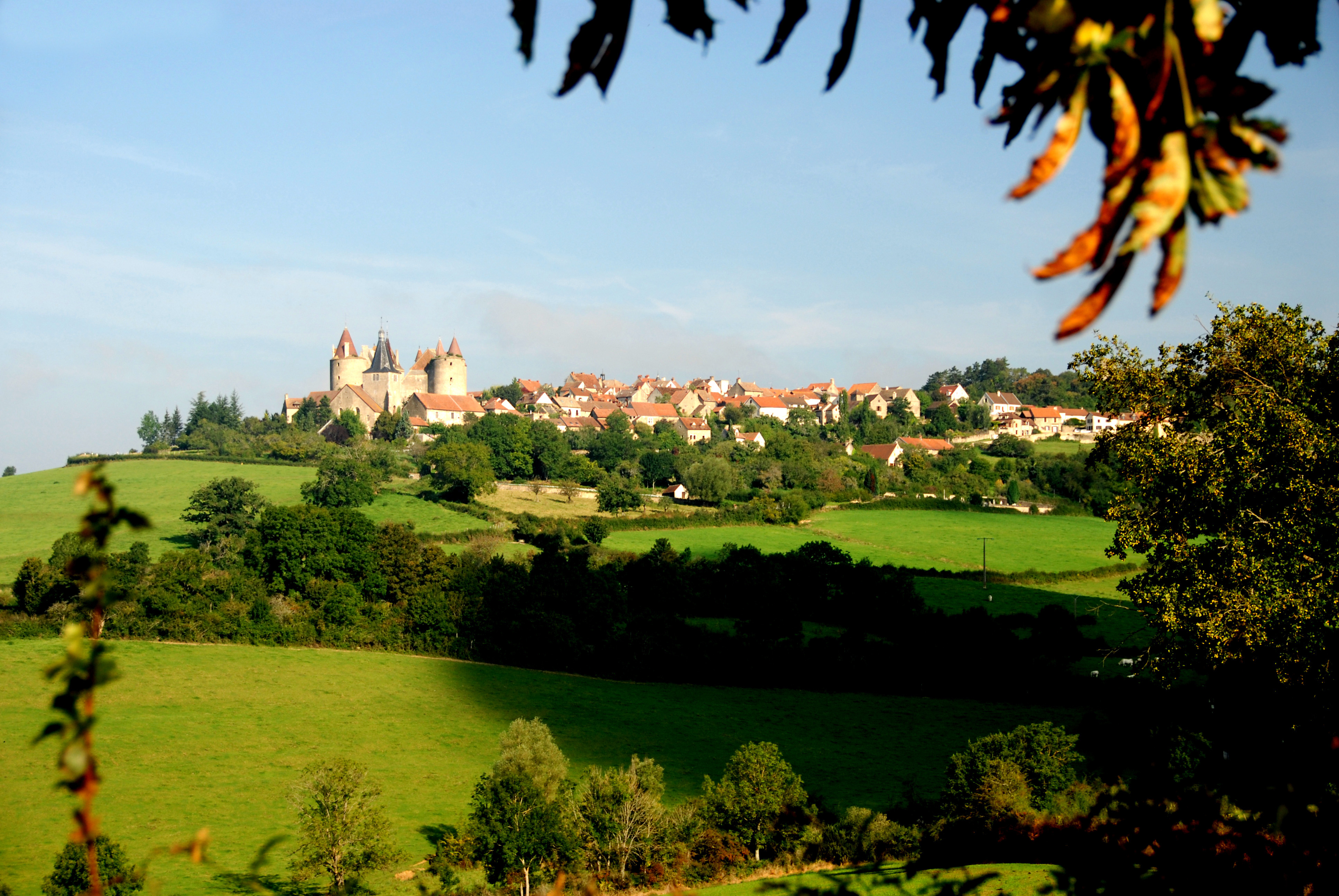
- Châteauneuf and its castle

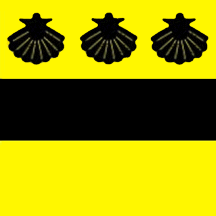
- Flag Coat of arms
- Location of Châteauneuf
- Location within France Location within Bourgogne-Franche-Comté
- Coordinates: 47°13′11″N 4°38′31″E
- Country: France
- Region: Bourgogne-Franche-Comté
- Department: Côte-d'Or
- Arrondissement: Beaune
- Canton: Arnay-le-Duc

Government
  - Mayor (2020–2026): Jean-Paul Maurice
- Area^{1}: 10.06 km^{2} (3.88 sq mi)
- Elevation: 475 m (1,558 ft)
- Highest elevation: 542 m (1,778 ft)
- Lowest elevation: 342 m (1,122 ft)
- Population (2023): 81
  - Density: 8.1/km^{2} (21/sq mi)
- Time zone: UTC+01:00 (CET)
  - Summer (DST): UTC+02:00 (CEST)
- INSEE/Postal code: 21152 /21320
- ^{1} French Land Register data, which excludes lakes, ponds, glaciers > 1 km^{2} (0.386 sq mi or 247 acres) and river estuaries.

Aerial views of Châteauneuf-en-Auxois, Côte-d'Or, France.

Châteauneuf (French pronunciation: [ʃɑtonœf]) or Châteauneuf-en-Auxois is a commune in the Côte-d'Or department in eastern France.

== Population ==
Historical population
| Year | Pop. | ±% p.a. |
|---|---|---|
| 1968 | 66 | — |
| 1975 | 63 | −0.66% |
| 1982 | 62 | −0.23% |
| 1990 | 63 | +0.20% |
| 1999 | 83 | +3.11% |
| 2007 | 87 | +0.59% |
| 2012 | 84 | −0.70% |
| 2017 | 85 | +0.24% |
| 2023 | 81 | −0.80% |
Source: INSEE

== Sights ==
Châteauneuf is dominated by its château, which was given in December 1456 by Philip the Good to Philippe Pot, whose renovations and fortification gave to it the aspect it retains today, with the arms of Pol and his orders of the Golden Fleece and of Saint-Michel. The medieval bourg that surrounds it is a member of the Les Plus Beaux Villages de France ("The most beautiful villages of France") association.

== See also ==
- Château de Châteauneuf
