= Château de la Rochepot =

Castle in La Rochepot in the Côte-d'Or department, Bourgogne-Franche-Comté, France

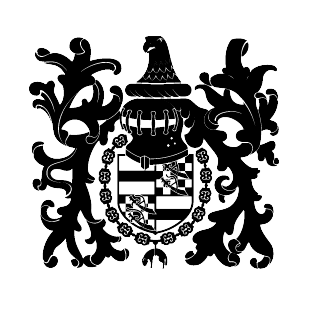
Château de La Rochepot
- Bourgogne-Franche-Comté; Near La Rochepot in France
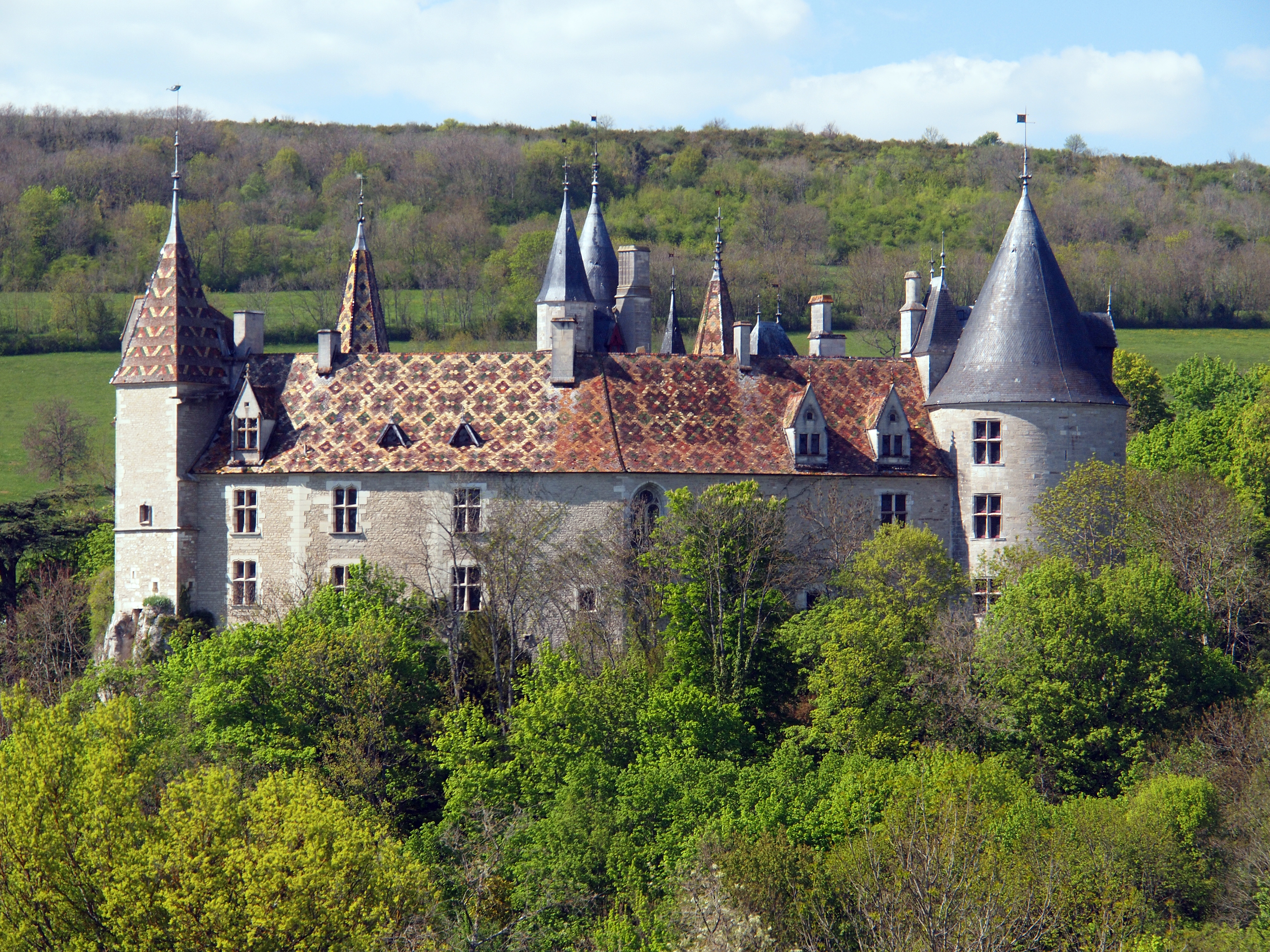

Site information
- Type: Chateau
- Owner: Descendants of Sadi Carnot (The Carnot family)
- Period and style: neo-Gothic-Burgundian style
- Website: https://chateau-de-la-rochepot.com/

Location
- Coordinates: 46°57′33″N 4°40′52″E

Site history
- Built: 12th century - 19th century
- Protection: Monument historique status. Regional level МН (2013), Monument historique status. National level MH (2014)
- Original owner: Seigneur Régnier Pot
- Old Provinces of France: Duchy of Burgundy
- Department: Côte-d'Or
- Commune: La Rochepot

Geographic location at the map France

Château de La Rochepot (French pronunciation: [ʃato də la ʁɔʃpo]) is a 12th-century feudal castle of neo-Gothic-Burgundian style, rebuilt in the 15th century. In the 19th century, it was completely restored and covered with glazed burgundy tiles. It is located in the commune of La Rochepot in the Côte-d'Or department, Bourgogne-Franche-Comté, France.

== History ==
The castle was built in 1180 on the ruins of a castle burnt down in the 11th century. It belonged to seigneur de Montagu Alexander of Burgundy (1170–1205) (son of Hugh III, Duke of Burgundy). Nowadays, these ruins are located in the nearby forest.

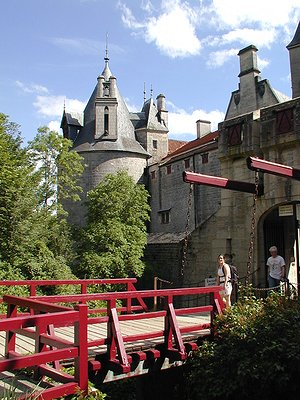

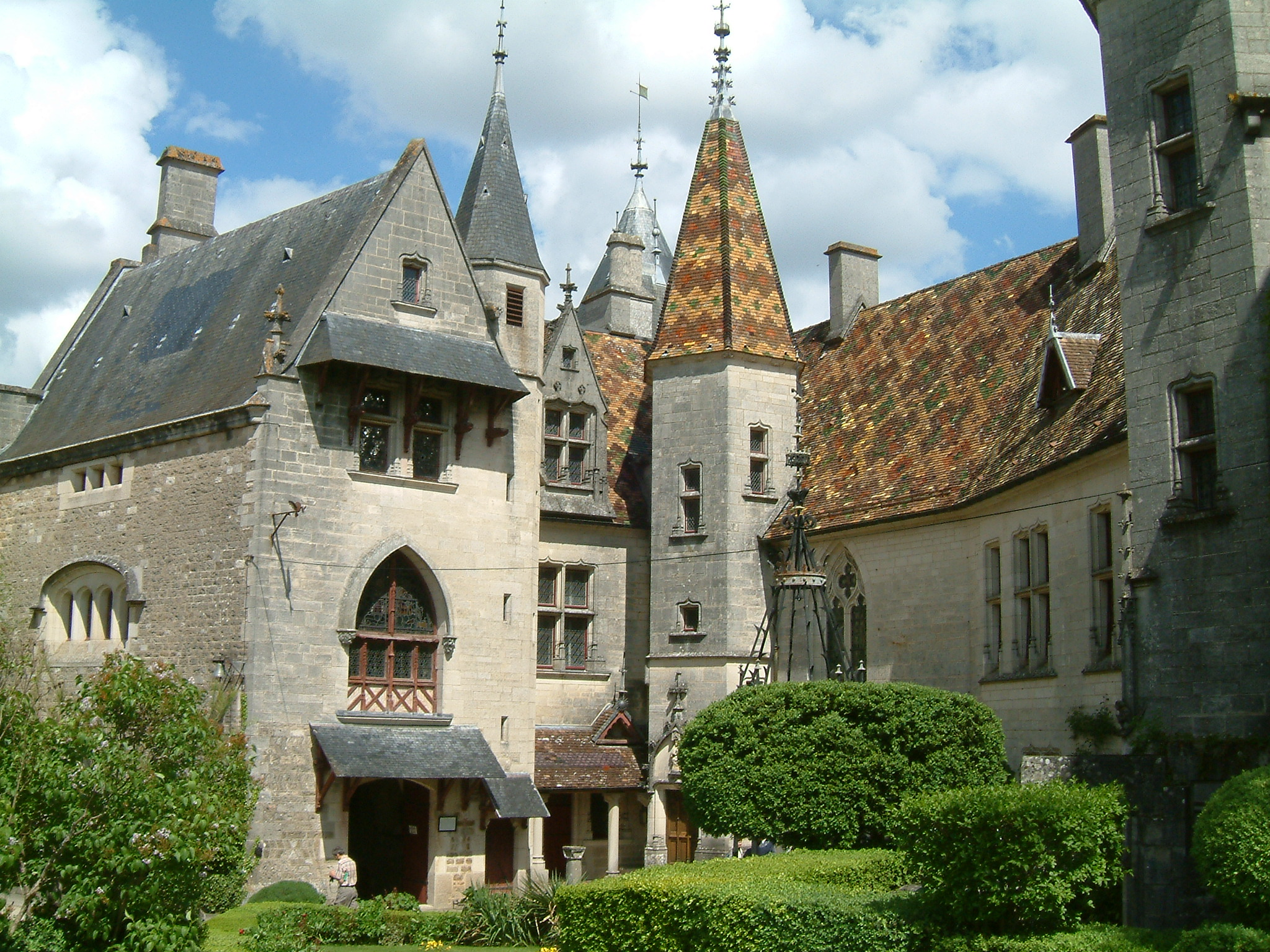

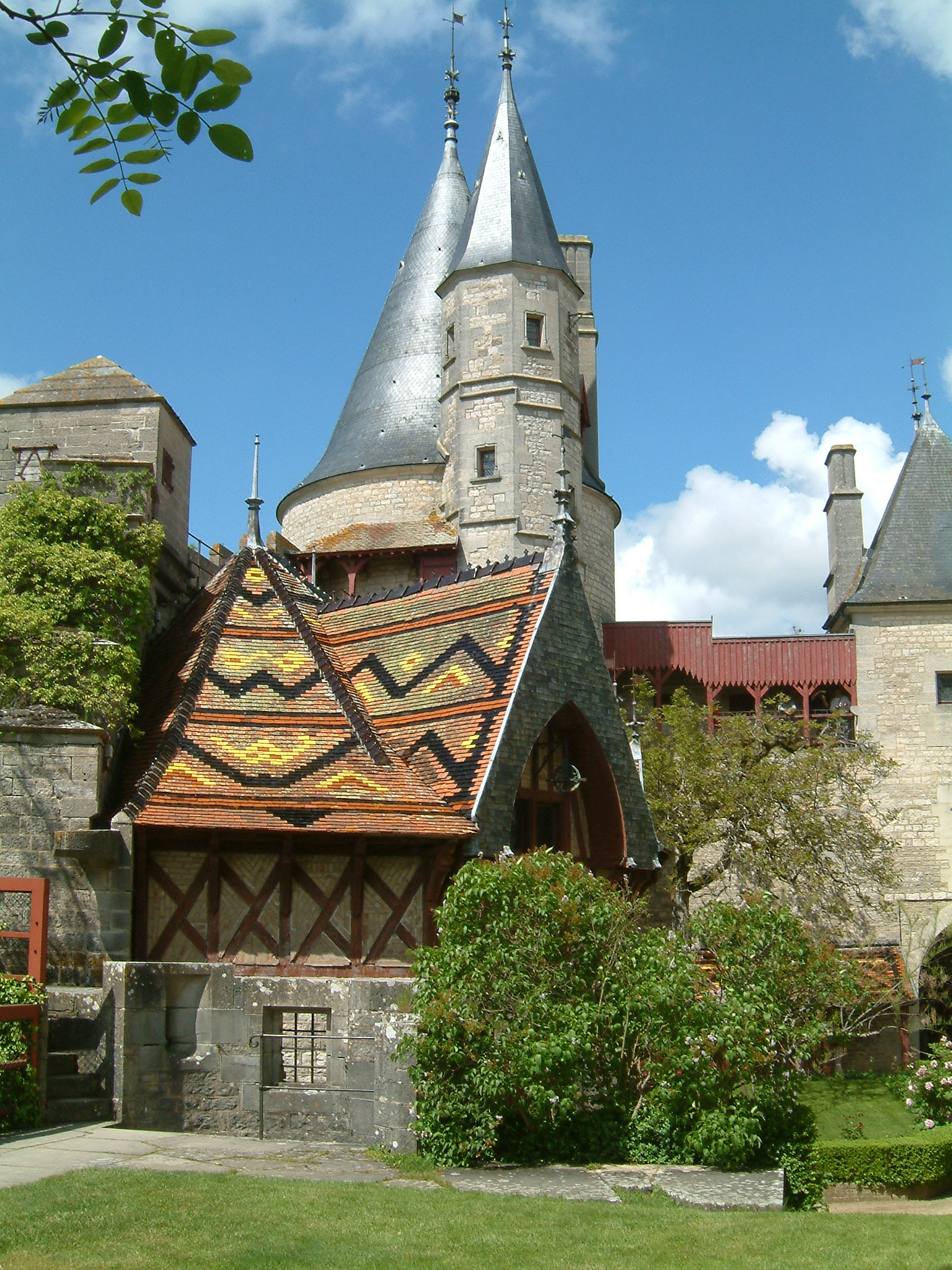

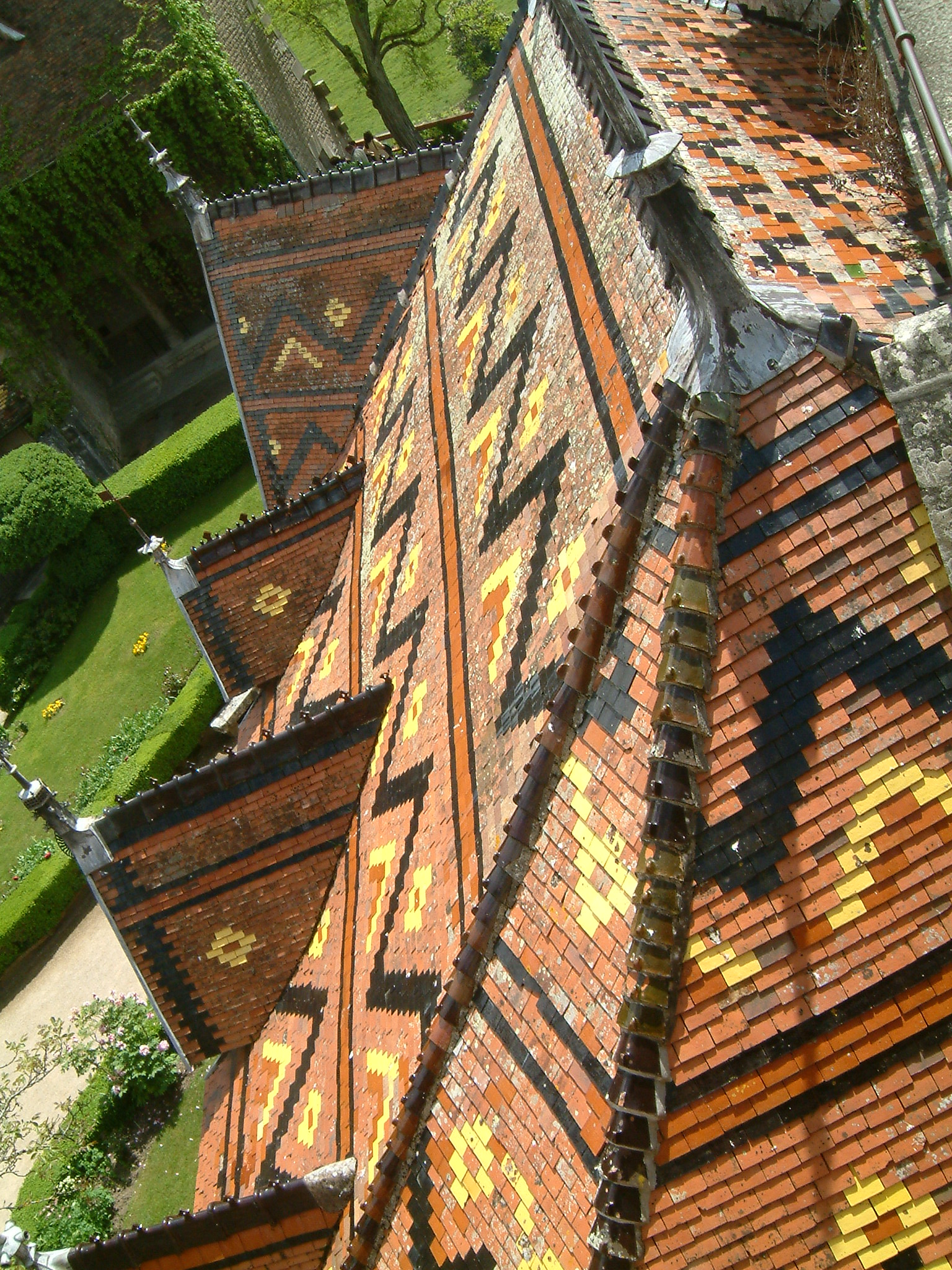

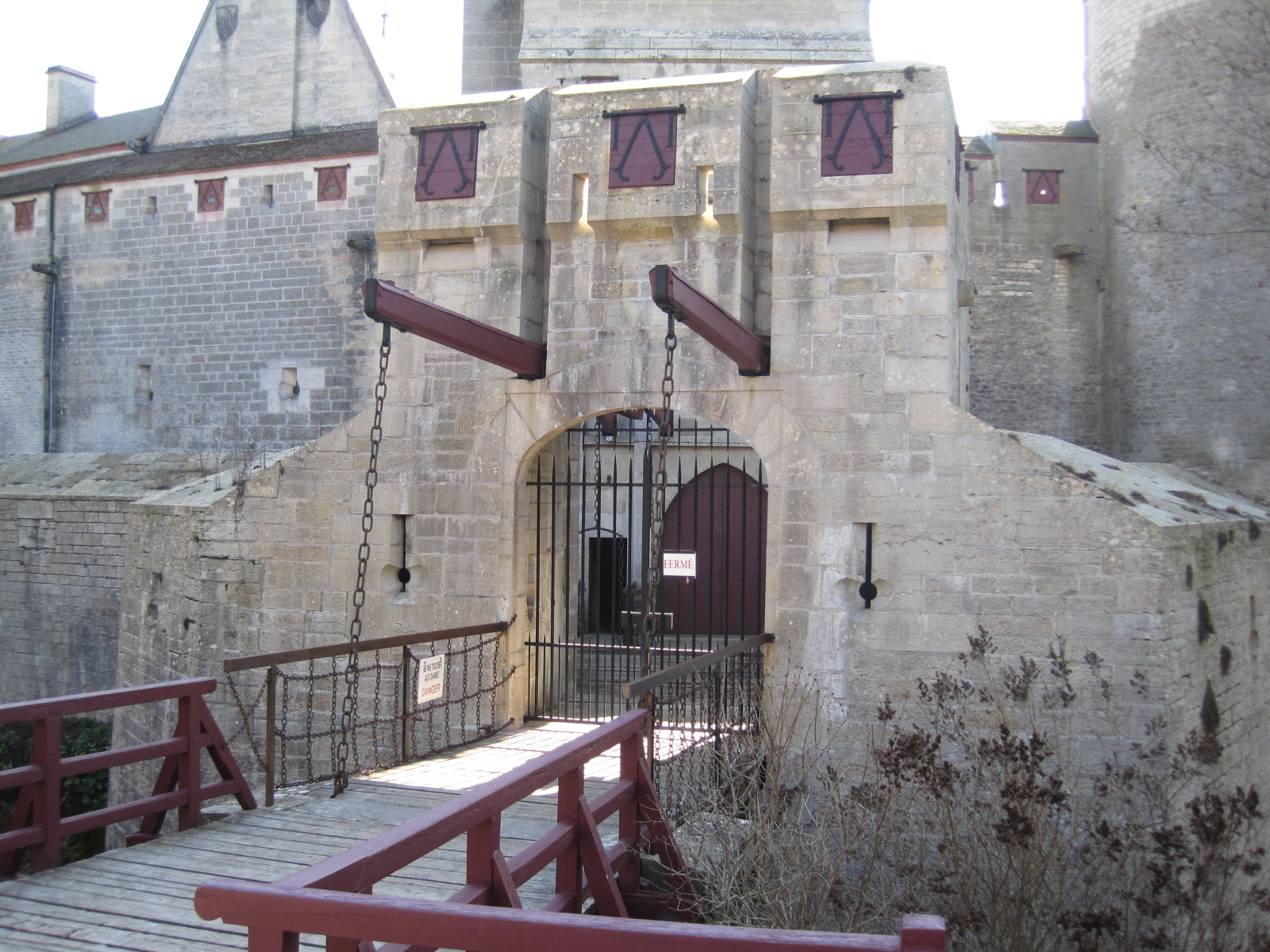

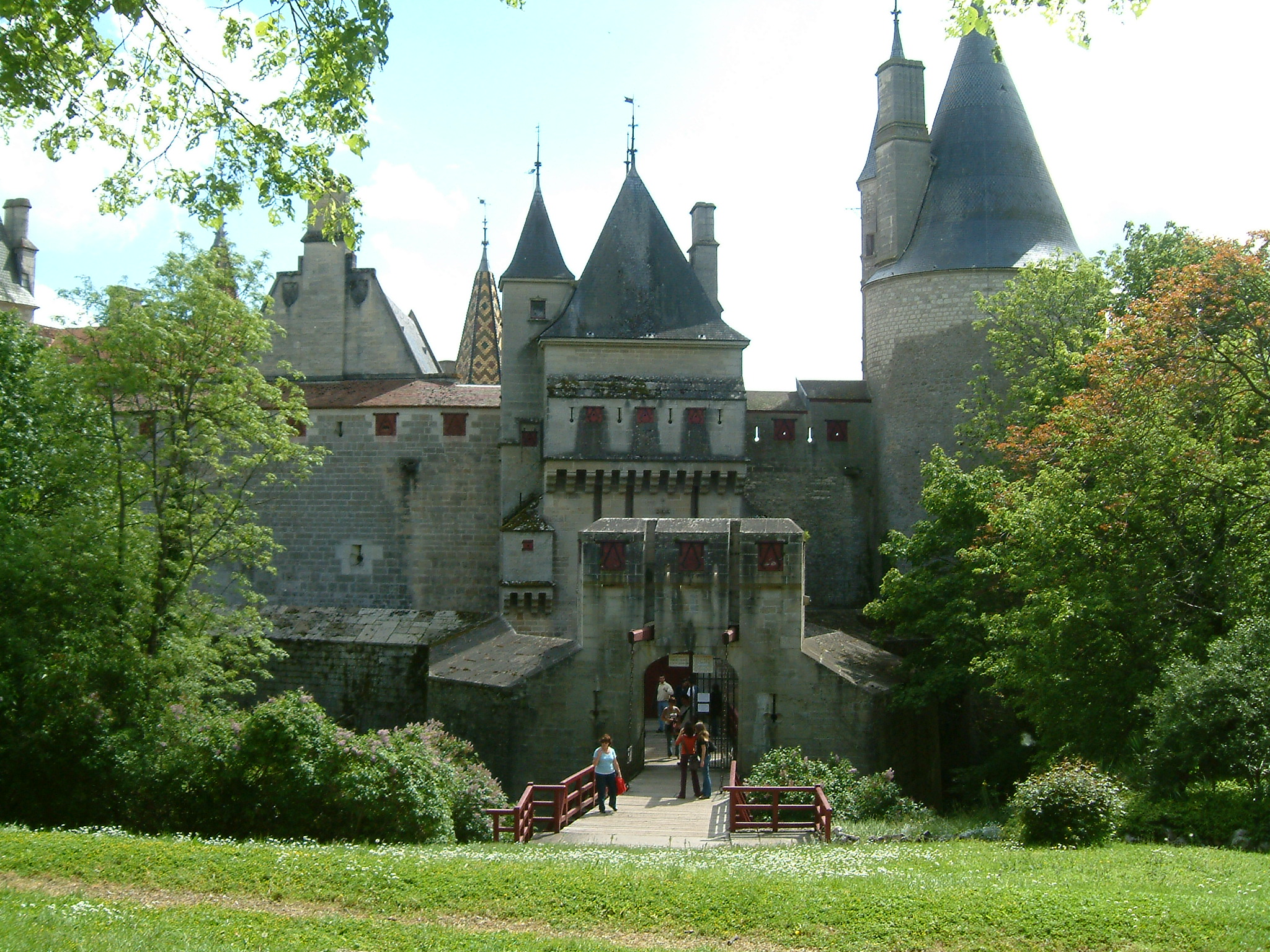

In 1403, having returned from the crusade, seigneur Régnier Pot (Chamberlain to the Duke of Burgundy, Philip the Bold and Knight of the Golden Fleece) bought the castle, then called Château de La Roche Nolay. He renamed it after himself and transferred it to his son, seigneur Jacques Pot, who, in turn, transferred it to his son, seigneur Philippe Pot.

After seigneur Régnier Pot bought the castle, Pinot noir grapes started being planted in its vicinity – as application of the Decree of Philip the Bold of 1395.

In the 16th century, Marshal of France Anne de Montmorency became the owner of the castle (he possessed more than 130 castles).

In the 17th century, Jean François Paul de Gondi, the Cardinal de Retz, inherited the castle and, in 1644, he sold it to the cavalier and first President of the Parliament of Burgundy Pierre Legoux de la Berchère.

Joseph Blancheton was the last lord of the castle.

In 1789, during the French Revolution, castle was renamed Château de La Roche Fidèle, declared a national asset, and afterwards was partially destroyed by vandals. Left without the keep, the domain passed from hand to hand.

In 1893, Cécile Carnot (the wife of Sadi Carnot, President of the Republic) purchased the ruins and offered them as a gift to her eldest son, infantry colonel Sadi Carnot (1865–1948), who during 26 years carried out a great and meticulous historical restoration in the spirit of the 15th century.

In 2013, some parts of the castle were acknowledged as regional historical monuments. In 2014, annex buildings, vineyards and the park were given the status of national monument.

In October 2018, the castle was seized by the French government after investigation into an alleged money laundering scheme by Dmytro Malynovskyi, a Ukrainian. Malynovski was arrested after an investigation into a corruption and money laundering scheme in which he purchased and lived in the castle after faking his own death.

== See also ==
- List of castles in France
