= Thorey-sur-Ouche =

- Commune
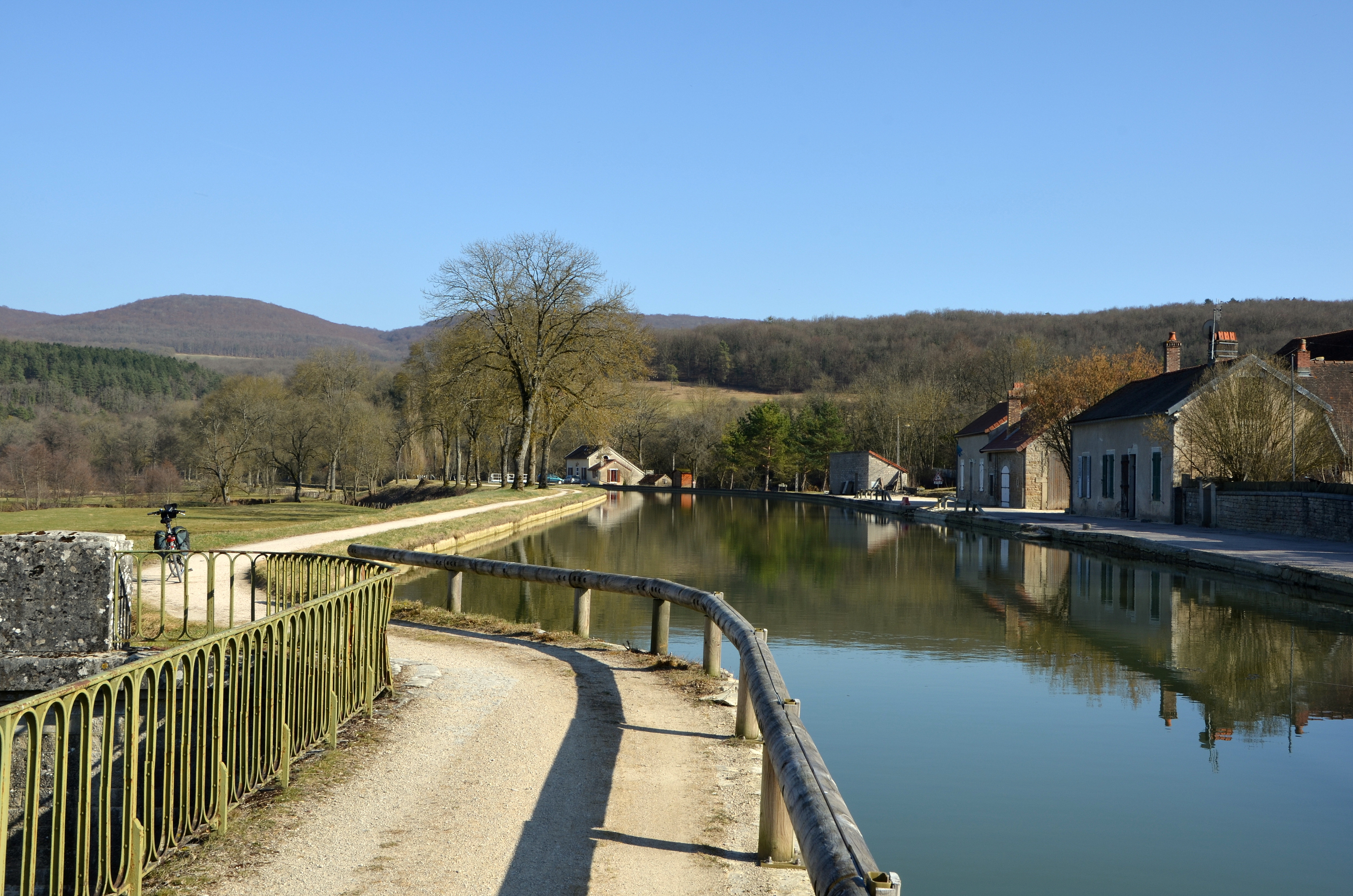
- Canal de Bourgogne
- Location of Thorey-sur-Ouche
- Location within France Location within Bourgogne-Franche-Comté
- Coordinates: 47°08′50″N 4°41′47″E
- Country: France
- Region: Bourgogne-Franche-Comté
- Department: Côte-d'Or
- Arrondissement: Beaune
- Canton: Arnay-le-Duc

Government
  - Mayor (2023–2026): Fabien Mignotte
- Area^{1}: 12.03 km^{2} (4.64 sq mi)
- Elevation: 338 m (1,109 ft)
- Highest elevation: 551 m (1,808 ft)
- Lowest elevation: 323 m (1,060 ft)
- Population (2023): 148
  - Density: 12.3/km^{2} (31.9/sq mi)
- Time zone: UTC+01:00 (CET)
  - Summer (DST): UTC+02:00 (CEST)
- INSEE/Postal code: 21634 /21360
- ^{1} French Land Register data, which excludes lakes, ponds, glaciers > 1 km^{2} (0.386 sq mi or 247 acres) and river estuaries.

Thorey-sur-Ouche (French pronunciation: [tɔʁɛ syʁ uʃ], literally Thorey on Ouche) is a commune in the Côte-d'Or department in eastern France.

== Population ==
Historical population
Year	Pop.	±% p.a.
1968	166	—
1975	132	−3.22%
1982	129	−0.33%
1990	121	−0.80%
1999	116	−0.47%
2007	147	+3.00%
2012	157	+1.32%
2017	144	−1.71%
2023	148	+0.46%
Source: INSEE

== See also ==
- Communes of the Côte-d'Or department
