= La Rochepot =

- Commune
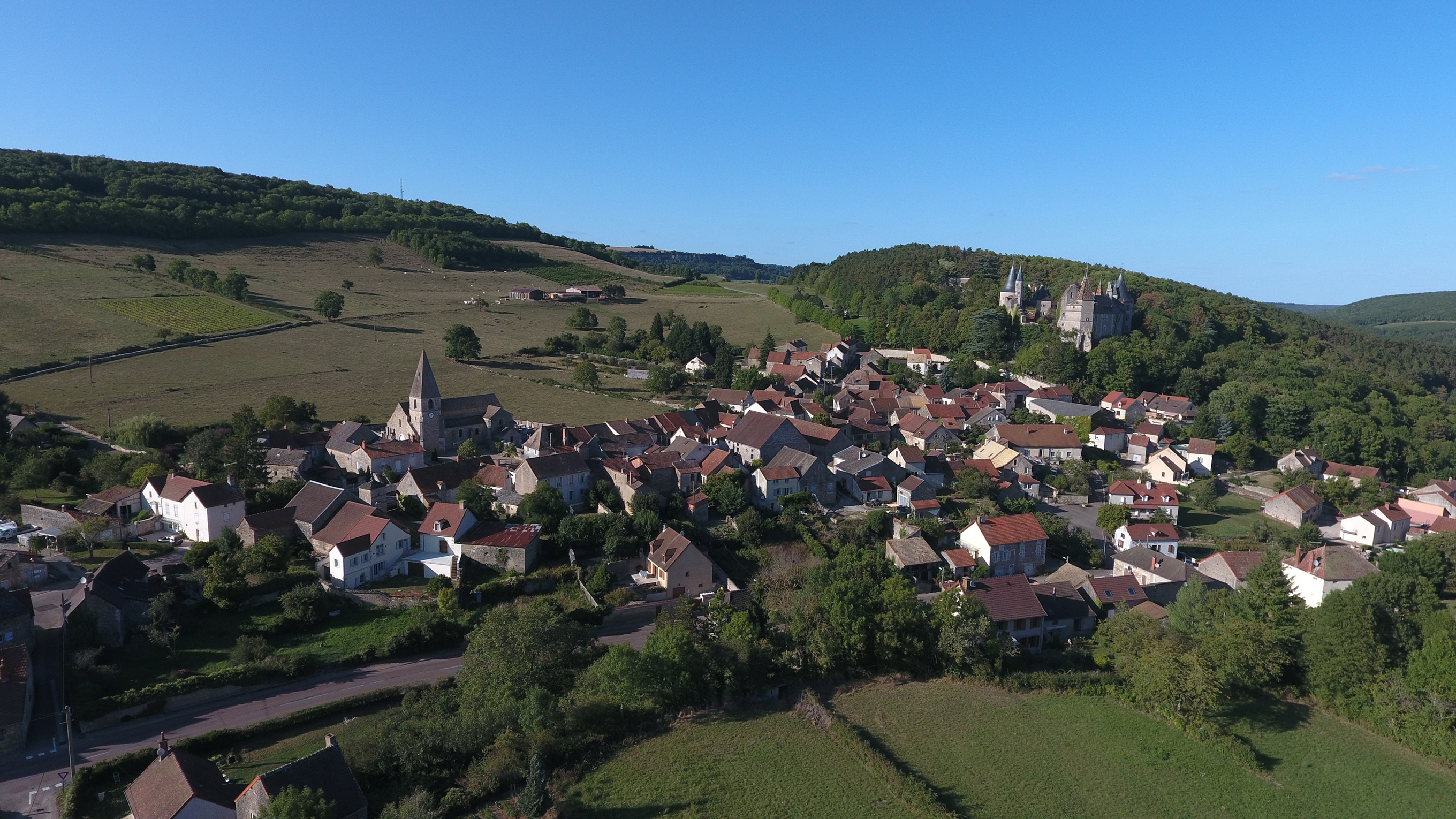
- A general view of La Rochepot

- Coat of arms
- Location of La Rochepot
- Location within France Location within Bourgogne-Franche-Comté
- Coordinates: 46°57′32″N 4°40′47″E
- Country: France
- Region: Bourgogne-Franche-Comté
- Department: Côte-d'Or
- Arrondissement: Beaune
- Canton: Arnay-le-Duc
- Intercommunality: CA Beaune Côte et Sud

Government
  - Mayor (2020–2026): Véronique Richer
- Area^{1}: 13.91 km^{2} (5.37 sq mi)
- Highest elevation: 561 m (1,841 ft)
- Lowest elevation: 324 m (1,063 ft)
- Population (2023): 284
  - Density: 20.4/km^{2} (52.9/sq mi)
- Time zone: UTC+01:00 (CET)
  - Summer (DST): UTC+02:00 (CEST)
- INSEE/Postal code: 21527 /21340
- ^{1} French Land Register data, which excludes lakes, ponds, glaciers > 1 km^{2} (0.386 sq mi or 247 acres) and river estuaries.

La Rochepot (French pronunciation: [la ʁɔʃpo]) is a commune in France in Bourgogne-Franche-Comté, Côte-d'Or department. It is a part of the canton of Arnay-le-Duc and of the arrondissement of Beaune. It has a hillside castle, converted to a château, on the D973 road between Beaune and Nolay on the way to Saisy.

The INSEE code is 21527.

== History ==
La Rochepot is known for its castle, the Château de la Rochepot. The earliest record of the castle dates back to 1180 when it was called "Château de La Roche Nolay". In 1403, the castle was bought by Regnier Pot, a knight, who renamed it.

The commune of La Rochepot is famous for its winemaking traditions. The primary cultivated grape varieties are Pinot Noir and Chardonnay.

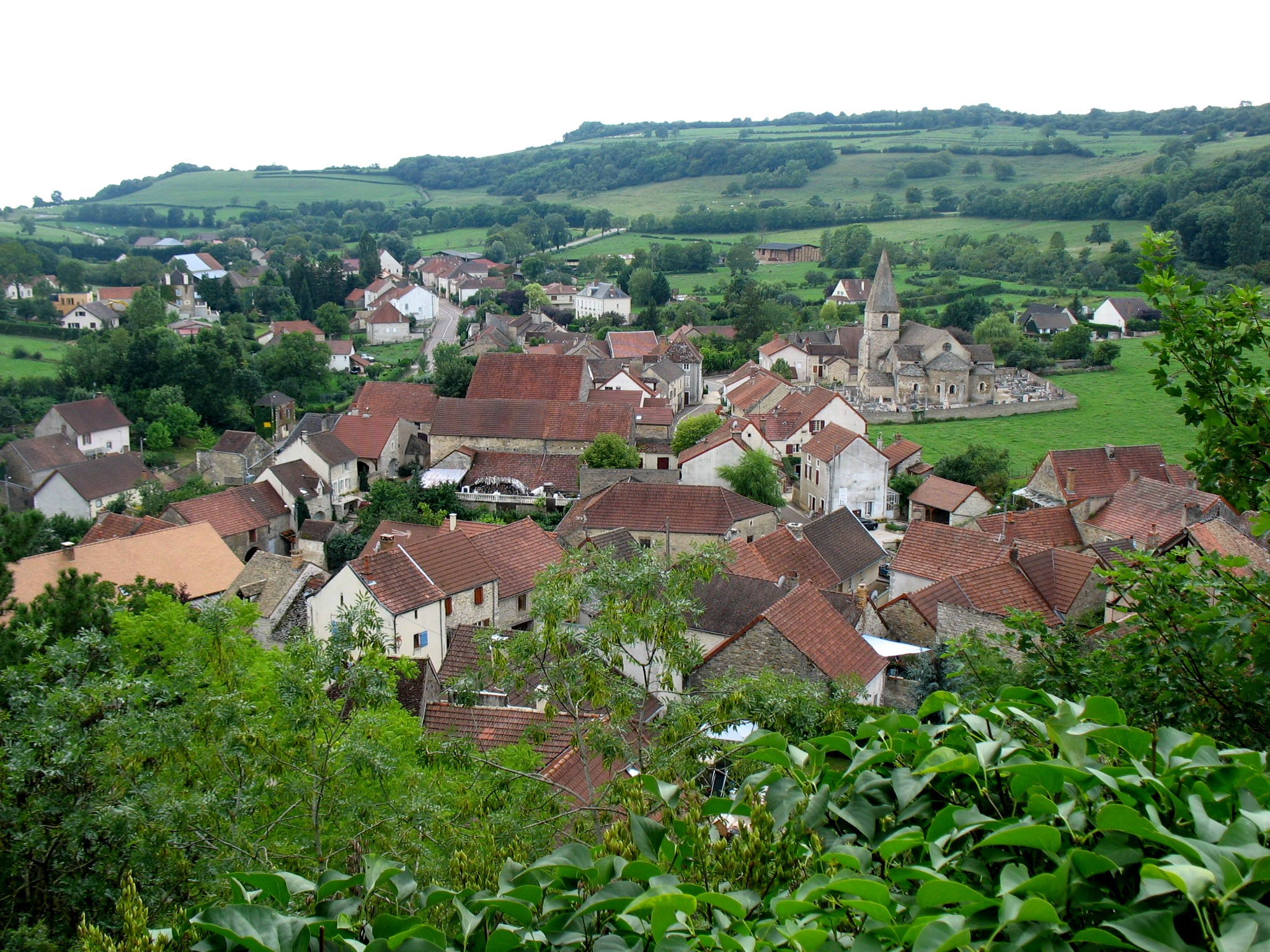
La Rochepot

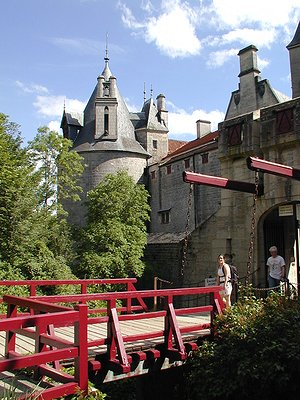
The château

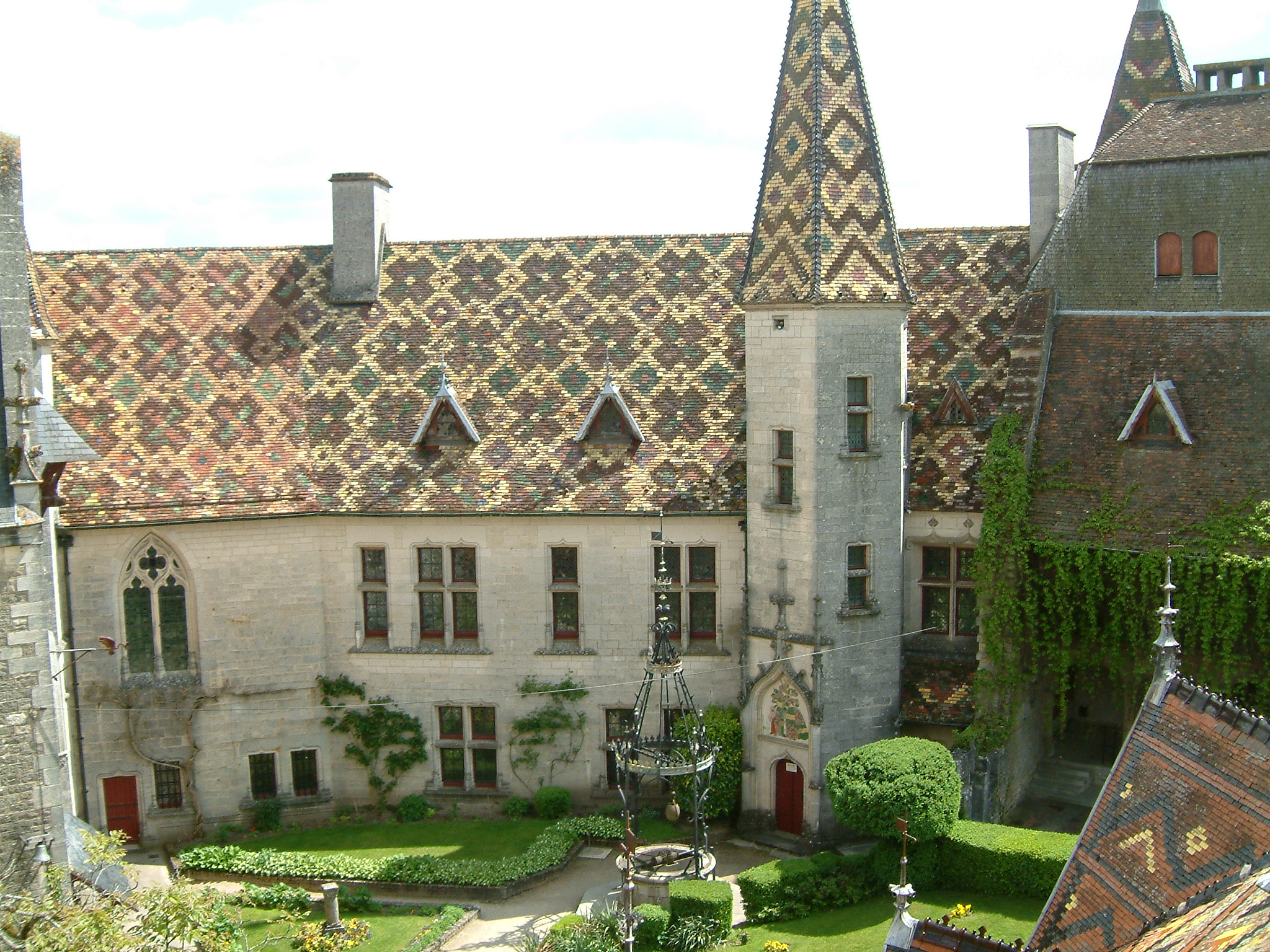
The château

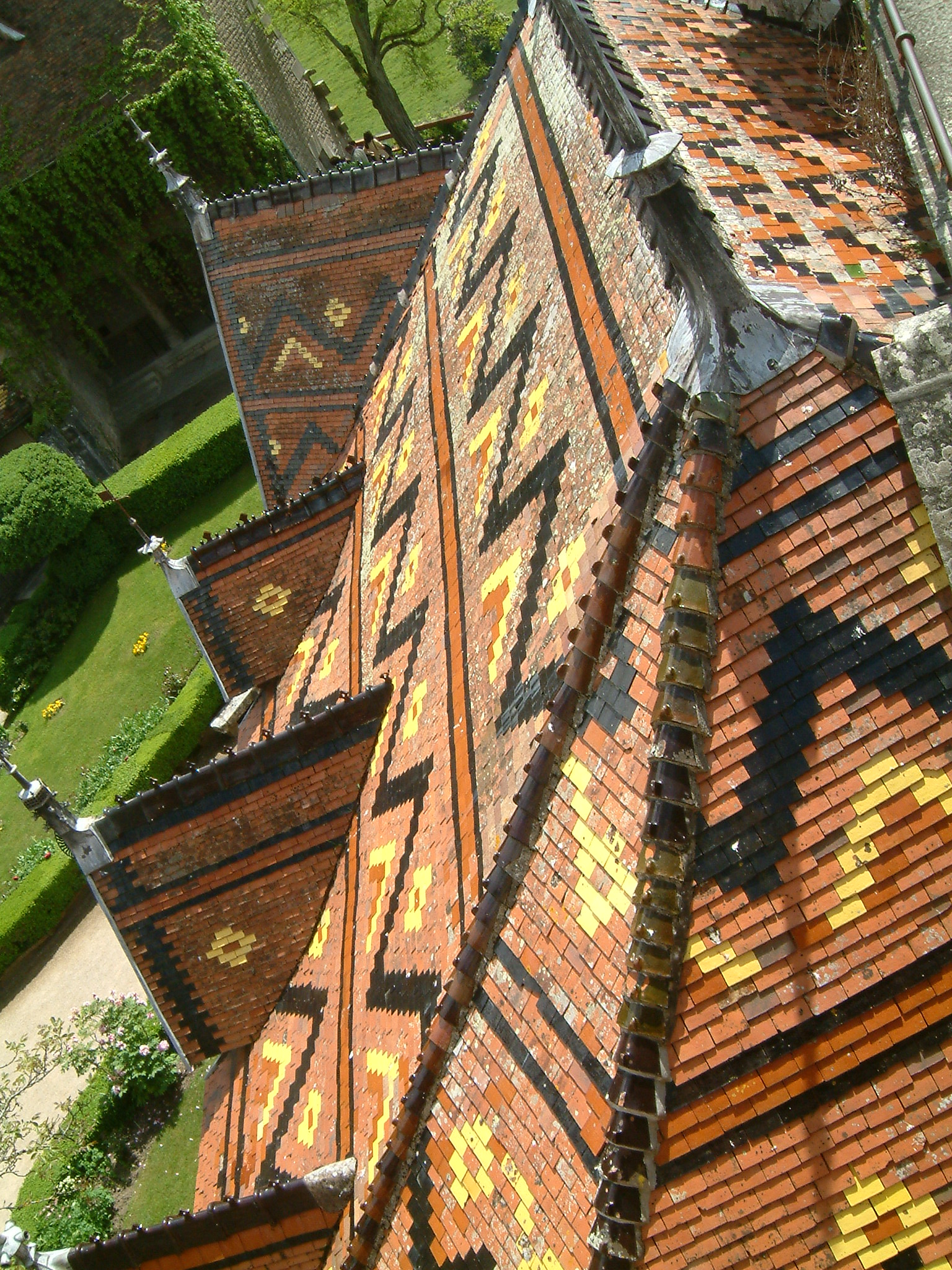
The château roof

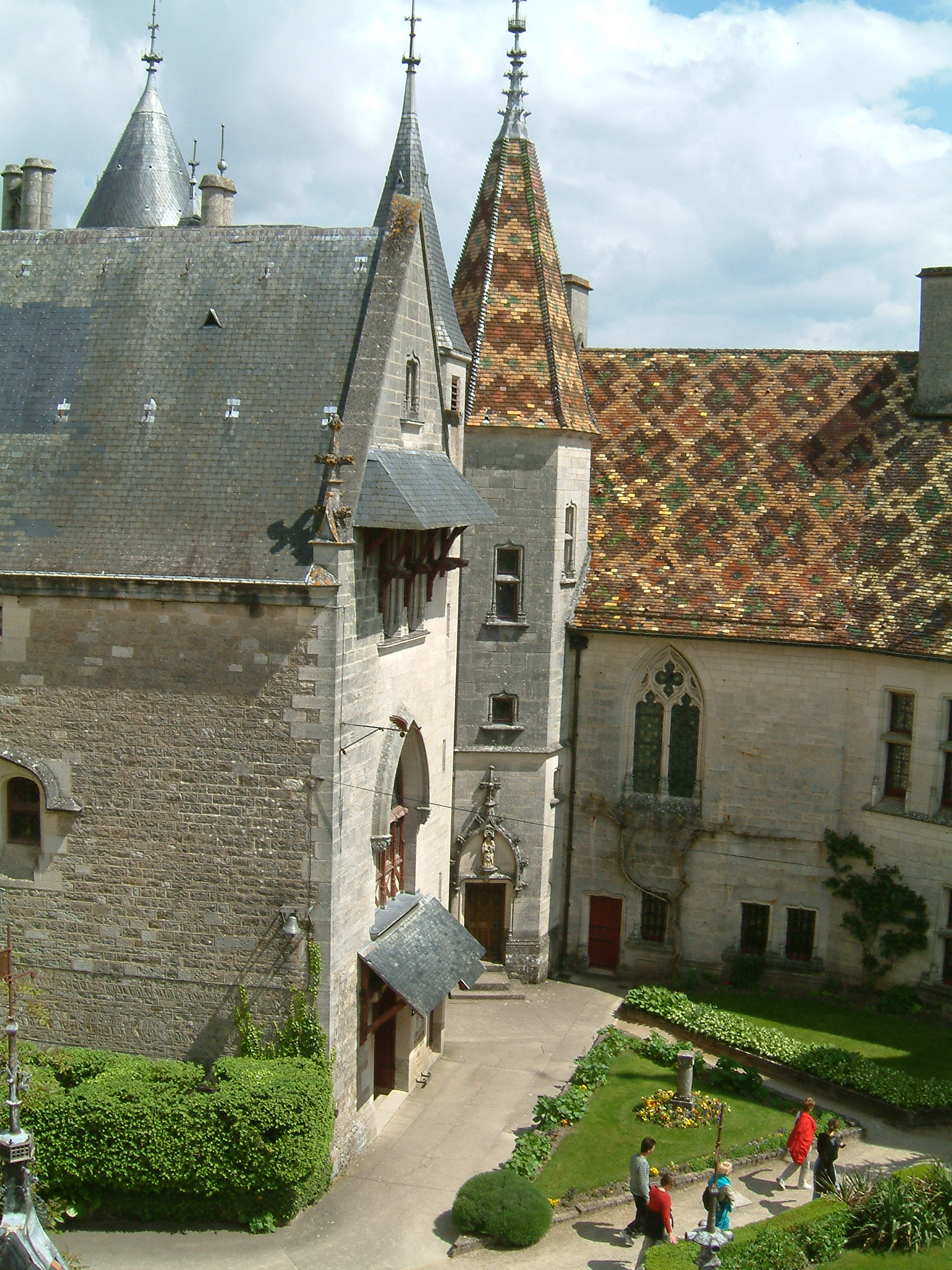
The château

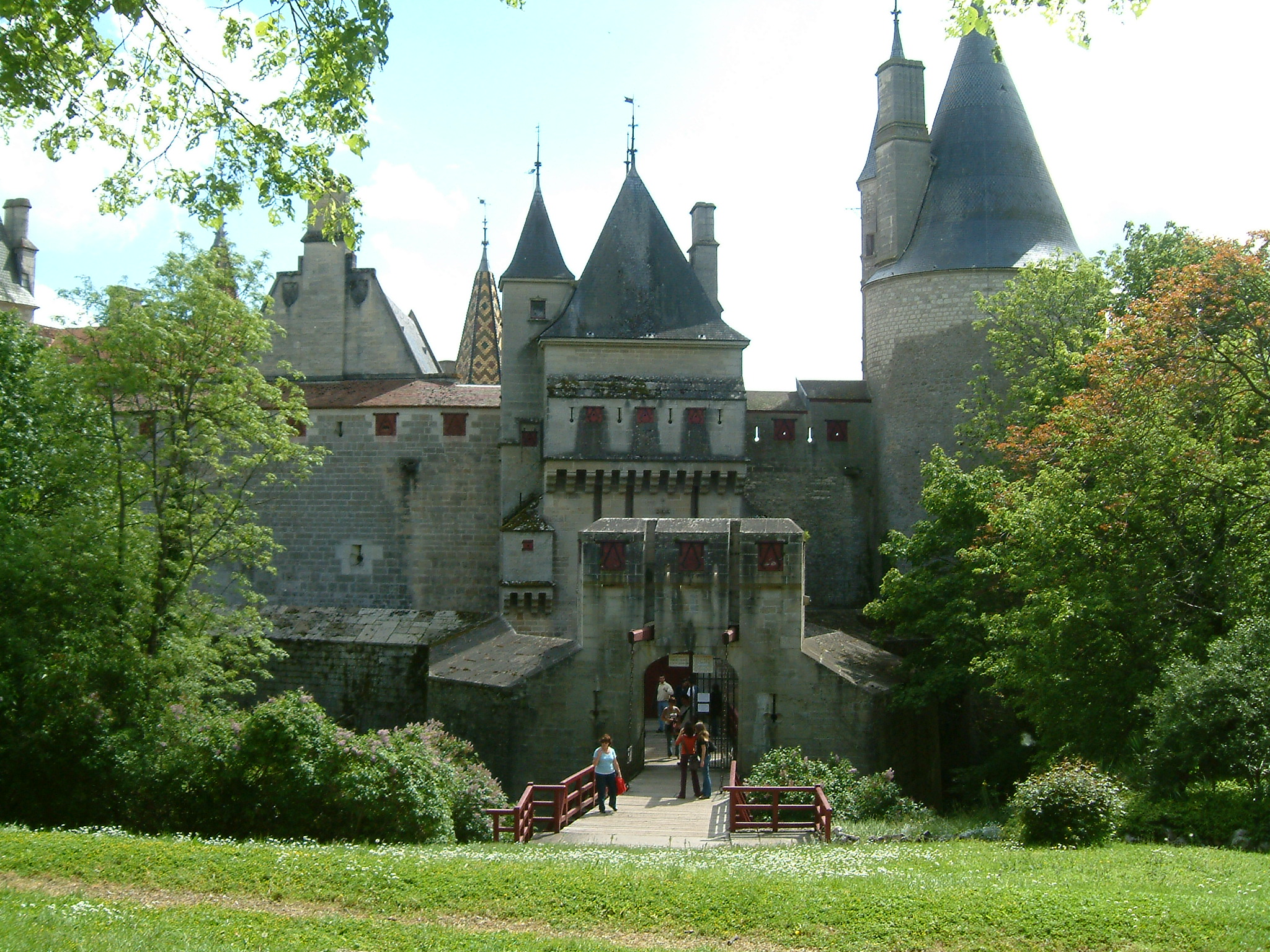
The château

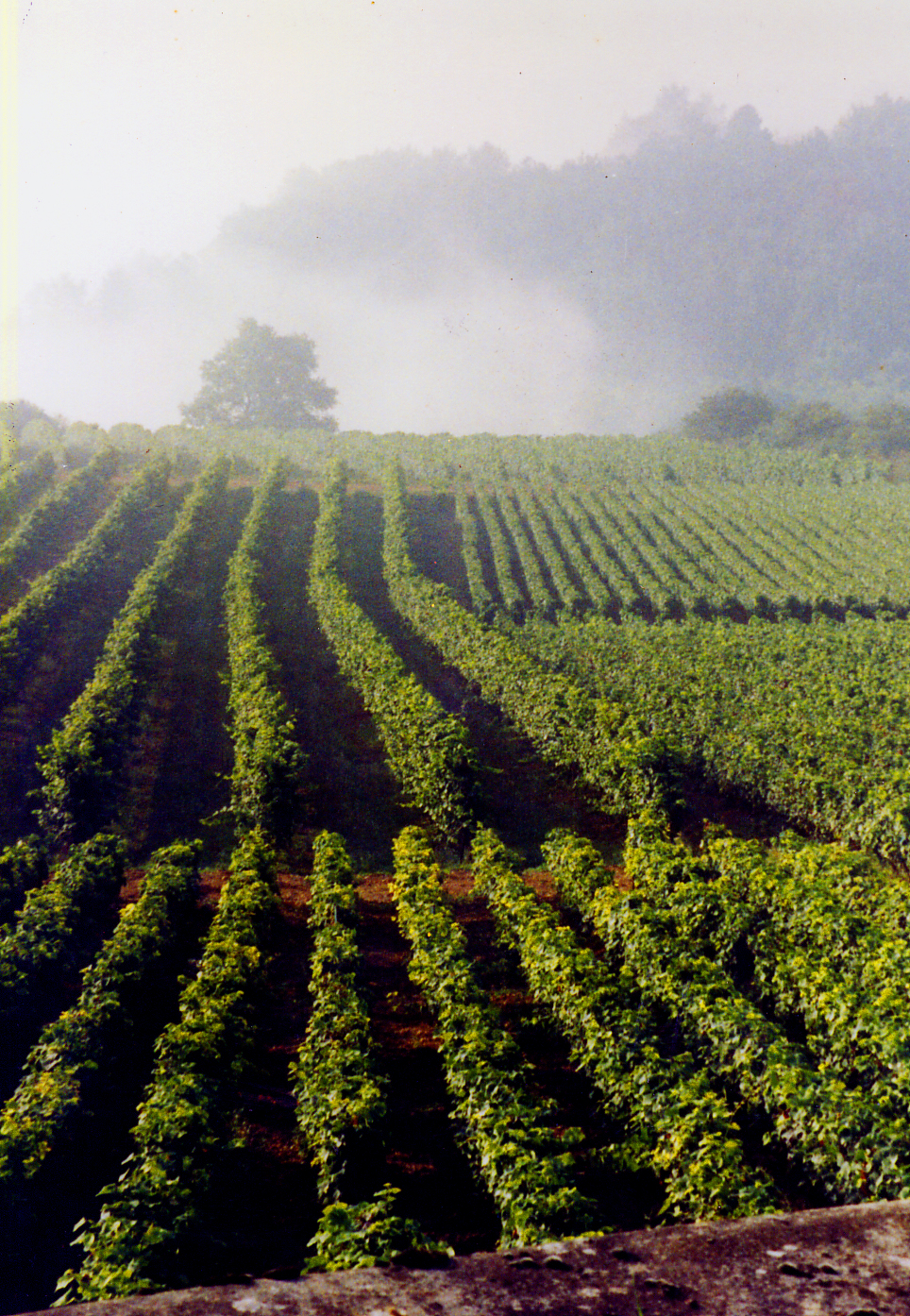
Vines

== Geography ==
=== Climate ===
La Rochepot has an oceanic climate (Köppen climate classification Cfb). The average annual temperature in La Rochepot is 10.2 °C (50.4 °F). The average annual rainfall is 837.3 mm (32.96 in) with May as the wettest month. The temperatures are highest on average in July, at around 19.3 °C (66.7 °F), and lowest in January, at around 1.6 °C (34.9 °F). The highest temperature ever recorded in La Rochepot was 39.0 °C (102.2 °F) on 12 August 2003; the coldest temperature ever recorded was −21.0 °C (−5.8 °F) on 9 January 1985.

Climate data for La Rochepot (1981–2010 averages, extremes 1949−present)
Month	Jan	Feb	Mar	Apr	May	Jun	Jul	Aug	Sep	Oct	Nov	Dec	Year
Record high °C (°F)	14.5 (58.1)	20.4 (68.7)	23.8 (74.8)	28.5 (83.3)	32.0 (89.6)	36.2 (97.2)	38.0 (100.4)	39.0 (102.2)	34.0 (93.2)	28.5 (83.3)	21.1 (70.0)	17.5 (63.5)	39.0 (102.2)
Mean daily maximum °C (°F)	4.4 (39.9)	6.2 (43.2)	10.8 (51.4)	14.4 (57.9)	18.9 (66.0)	22.5 (72.5)	25.2 (77.4)	24.6 (76.3)	20.1 (68.2)	14.8 (58.6)	8.5 (47.3)	5.1 (41.2)	14.7 (58.5)
Daily mean °C (°F)	1.6 (34.9)	2.6 (36.7)	6.3 (43.3)	9.2 (48.6)	13.5 (56.3)	16.8 (62.2)	19.3 (66.7)	18.8 (65.8)	14.9 (58.8)	10.7 (51.3)	5.3 (41.5)	2.4 (36.3)	10.2 (50.4)
Mean daily minimum °C (°F)	−1.3 (29.7)	−1.0 (30.2)	1.7 (35.1)	4.0 (39.2)	8.2 (46.8)	11.2 (52.2)	13.3 (55.9)	13.0 (55.4)	9.7 (49.5)	6.6 (43.9)	2.1 (35.8)	−0.3 (31.5)	5.6 (42.1)
Record low °C (°F)	−21.0 (−5.8)	−20.0 (−4.0)	−14.5 (5.9)	−5.5 (22.1)	−3.0 (26.6)	1.5 (34.7)	4.0 (39.2)	0.0 (32.0)	0.0 (32.0)	−6.0 (21.2)	−11.0 (12.2)	−18.0 (−0.4)	−21.0 (−5.8)
Average precipitation mm (inches)	67.6 (2.66)	56.2 (2.21)	55.1 (2.17)	68.2 (2.69)	82.9 (3.26)	72.5 (2.85)	65.9 (2.59)	59.6 (2.35)	71.3 (2.81)	81.3 (3.20)	81.9 (3.22)	74.8 (2.94)	837.3 (32.96)
Average precipitation days (≥ 1.0 mm)	11.9	10.5	10.4	10.6	11.5	8.7	7.4	8.3	8.4	11.0	12.1	12.2	123.1
Source: Meteociel

== Population ==
Historical population
Year	Pop.	±% p.a.
1968	275	—
1975	258	−0.91%
1982	272	+0.76%
1990	241	−1.50%
1999	260	+0.85%
2007	281	+0.98%
2012	289	+0.56%
2017	291	+0.14%
2023	284	−0.40%
Source: INSEE

== Economy ==
In 2010, of 171 persons of working age (15–64 years old), 120 were regarded as economically active; the economic activity rate was 70,2% compared to 71.9% in 1999. Of the 120 active persons, 115 persons (65 men and 50 women) had a job, five were jobless (3 men and 2 women). Of the 51 economically inactive persons, 14 persons were schoolchildren and students, 24 were retired and 13 were inactive for other reasons.

== See also ==
- Communes of the Côte-d'Or department
- List of arrondissements of France
