= Saint Anthony =

Saint Anthony, Antony, or Antonius may refer to:

== People ==
- Anthony the Great (251–356), Egyptian Christian saint and Desert Father
- Anthony of Antioch (266–302), priest, hermit, and martyr
- Antoninus of Pamiers (c. 200s/300s), also known as Anthony of Pamiers
- Anthony the Hermit (c. 468 – c. 520), also known as Antony of Lérins
- Antony the Younger (785–865), Byzantine monk
- Anthony of Kiev (983–1073), also known as Anthony of the Caves
- Anthony of Rome (died 1147), also known as Antony Rimlyanin
- Anthony of Padua (1195–1231), Doctor of the Church, also known as Saint Anthony of Lisbon
- Antoninus of Florence (1389–1459), also known as Anthony of Florence
- Anthony of Siya (1479–1556), founder of the Antonievo-Siysky Monastery
- Anthony of St. Ann Galvão (1739–1822), also known as Frei Galvão
- Anthony Mary Claret (1807–1870), founder of the Missionary Sons of the Immaculate Heart of Mary

== Orders ==
- Order of Saint Anthony (Ethiopia), an Ethiopian religious order founded in 370
- Hospital Brothers of St. Anthony, a religious medical order founded c. 1095
- Order of Saint Anthony (Bavaria), a Bavarian military order founded in 1382
- St. Anthony Hall, a U.S. college literary society founded in 1847

== Places ==
=== Canada ===
- St. Anthony, Newfoundland and Labrador

=== England ===
- St Anthony-in-Meneage, Cornwall
- St Anthony in Roseland, Cornwall
- St Anthony Head, Roseland Peninsula, Cornwall

=== Spain ===
- Sant Antoni de Calonge, part of the city of Calonge, Catalonia, Spain.

=== Switzerland ===
- St. Antoni, a former municipality in the canton of Fribourg

=== United States ===
- St. Anthony, Idaho
- Saint Anthony, Indiana
- St. Anthony, Iowa
- St. Anthony, New Orleans, Louisiana
- St. Anthony, former twin city of Minneapolis; see History of Minneapolis
- St. Anthony, Minnesota, in Hennepin County
- St. Anthony, Stearns County, Minnesota
- Saint Anthony, Missouri
- Saint Anthony, North Dakota
- San Antonio, Texas
- Saint Anthony, Wisconsin
- Saint Anthony Falls in Minneapolis, Minnesota, highest waterfall on the Mississippi River

=== Caribbean region ===
- Saint Anthony Parish, Montserrat

=== Africa ===
- San Antonio de Palé on Annobón, particularly in reference to the British fort there in the 19th century

== Other ==
- St. Anthony College, Roxas City, Capiz, Philippines
- St. Anthony Dining Room, a charitable organization in San Francisco, California that provides meals to the homeless
- St Anthony (ship), wrecked in 1527

== See also ==
- Anthony (disambiguation)
- Antony (disambiguation)
- St. Anthony Church (disambiguation)
- St. Anthony Hall (disambiguation)
- St. Anthony Hospital (disambiguation)
- St Anthony's College (disambiguation)
- St. Anthony's Cross
- Saint Anthony's fire (disambiguation)
- St Anthony's F.C., a football club in Scotland
- St Anthony's Girls' Catholic Academy, a secondary school in Sunderland, England
- St Anthony's Hall, a building in York, England
- St. Anthony's Hospital (disambiguation)
- St. Anthony's School (disambiguation)
- Weingut St. Antony in Nierstein

Saint Anthony in (in Spanish, Italian, Portuguese, and German)

- San Antonio (disambiguation)
- Sant'Antonio (disambiguation)
- Santo Antônio de Lisboa (disambiguation)
- Sankt Anton (disambiguation)
