= Tomb of Isabella of Bourbon =

Sculpted tomb dedicated to Isabella of Bourbon

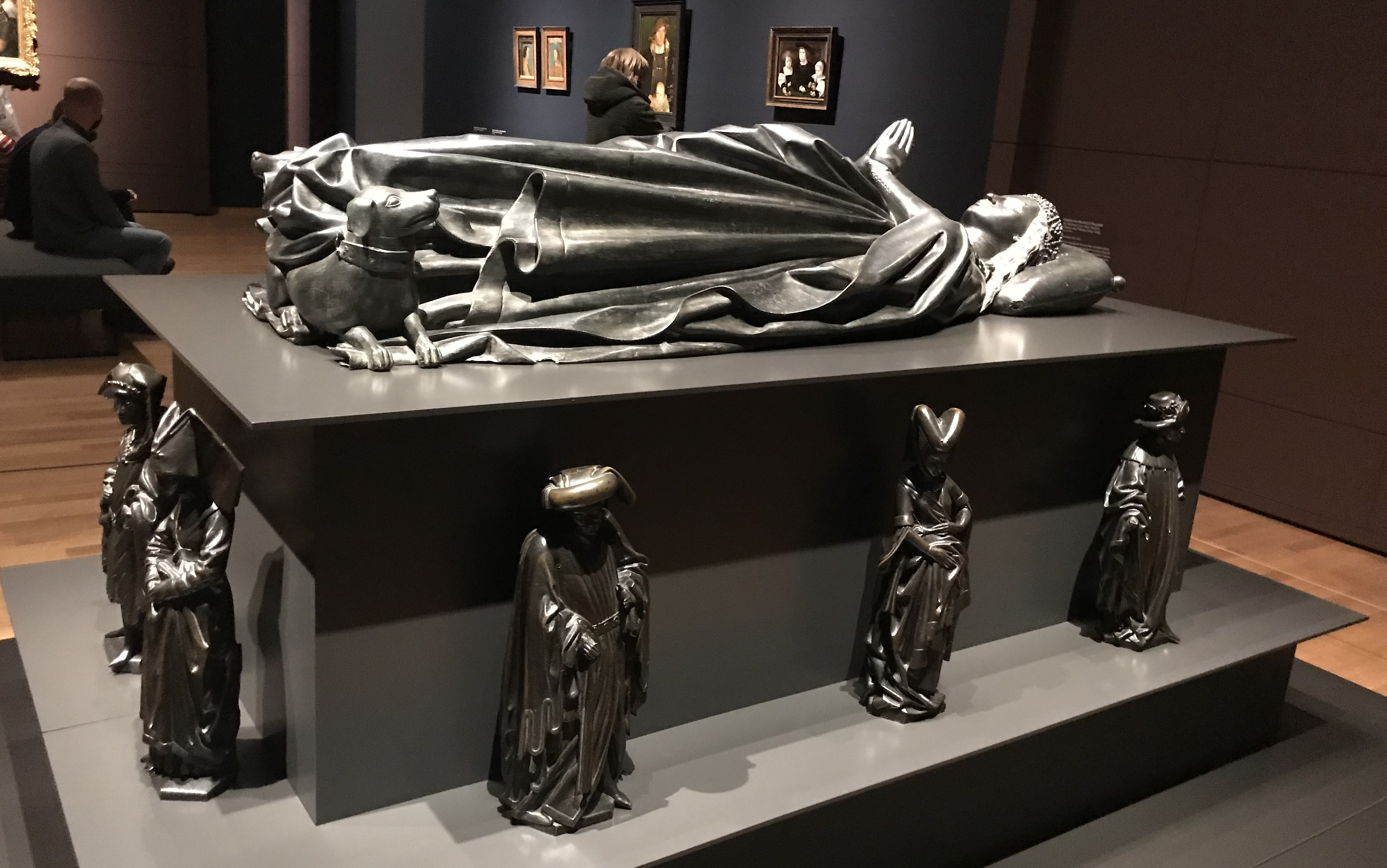
- Reconstruction of the tomb, showing Isabella's effigy displayed with the 10 surviving pleurants. Rijksmuseum, 2021
- Material: Effigy: Black marble, bronze; Pleurants: bronze, black lacquer patina
- Size: Tomb: Pleurants: height (avg): 55 cm (22 in)
- Created: Between 1475 and 1476
- Period/culture: Late Medieval, Northern Renaissance
- Present location: Effigy: St. Michael's Abbey, Antwerp; Pleurants: Rijksmuseum, Amsterdam
- Identification: Pleurants: BK-AM-33

The tomb of Isabella of Bourbon was a funeral monument built for Isabella of Bourbon, a member of the House of Valois-Burgundy, then rulers of the Burgundian State. Little is known about her due to her death of tuberculosis in 1465 aged 31. Her monument was commissioned by her daughter Mary of Burgundy and constructed in Brussels sometime between 1475 and 1476 by Jan Borman and Renier van Thienen. Originally placed in the church of St. Michael's Abbey, Antwerp in 1476, it was dismantled in August 1566 during the Iconoclastic Fury when parts were either destroyed or looted. Other elements of the tomb were lost during the French Revolution when the church itself was destroyed.

The tomb is made from black marble and bronze and originally held 24 pleurants (mourners or weepers) statuettes positioned in niches below Isabella's effigy, of which ten (five men and five women) are extant. The mourner's faces and clothing are individualised and based on her direct ancestors, copied from the now lost tombs of Louis II, Count of Flanders (died 1384) and Joan of Brabant (died 1406), hence their clothes are of a much earlier fashion.

The surviving elements consist of the effigy in the ambulatory of Our Lady's Cathedral, Antwerp, and ten pleurants in the Rijksmuseum, Amsterdam.

== Death of Isabella of Bourbon ==
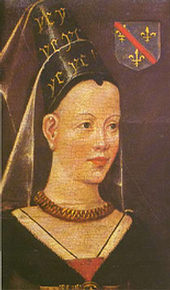
Isabella of Bourbon, unknown date, Ghent City Museum

Isabella of Bourbon was born c. 1434 as the second daughter of Charles I, Duke of Bourbon and Agnes of Burgundy, duchess of Bourbon and Auvergne and the daughter of John the Fearless, Duke of Burgundy between 1404 and 1419. Isabella was raised in the court of her uncle, Philip the Good, and became a favourite of his. She married her cousin Charles the Bold in 1454 as his second wife. Although the marriage was politically motivated as part of a truce between Charles I and Charles the Bold, the couple fell in love and became known for their fidelity to each other.

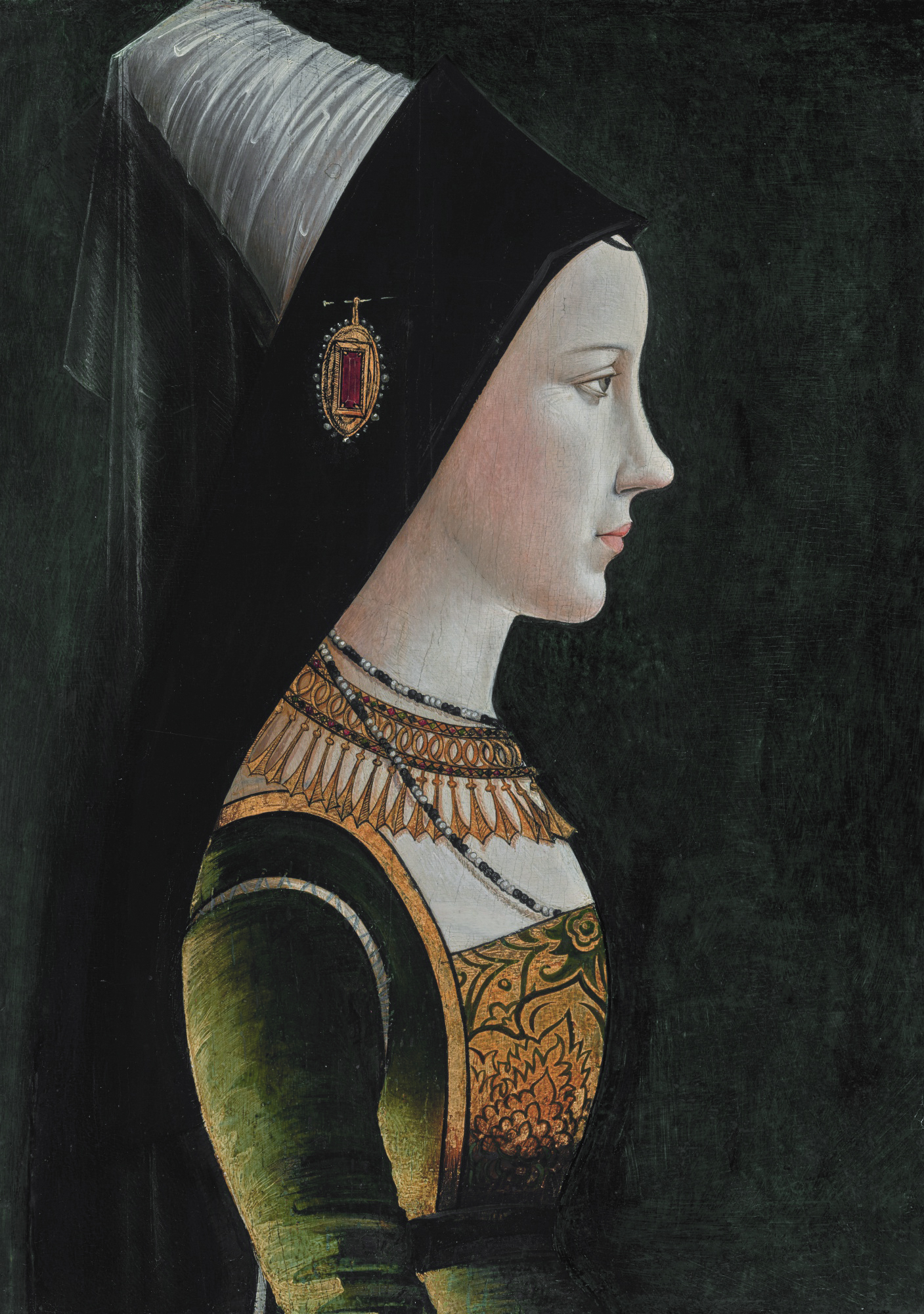
Mary of Burgundy, portrayed c. 1490

Little is known of Isabella's life, in part because she died aged 31, after a months-long illness with tuberculosis. Her husband was unable to attend her funeral in Bruges as he was overseeing the aftermath of his successful battle against his long term enemy Louis XI at the Battle of Montlhéry. Her only daughter Mary of Burgundy (1457–1482) was eight years old when her mother died. Aged 19, she inherited the Burgundian lands and became the last of the House of Valois-Burgundy on her father's death at the Battle of Nancy in January 1477. She married Maximilian I, Holy Roman Emperor (Maximilian of Austria), aged 20. Mary was a well-recognised patron of the arts, and she commissioned her mother's tomb on her eighteenth birthday in 1475. She oversaw and approved many elements of its design—as she later did with the tomb for her uncle Jacques de Bourbon (that is, James I, Count of La Marche).

Art historians generally attributed the castings to Renier van Thienen (born 1465), which were likely based on wood carvings by Jan Borman (fl. c. 1479 – 1520). Van Thienen was also a tax collector and burgomaster, and often produced sculptures under commission from the Burgundian court. Borman was also well known in Brussels, and is often attributed with the carvings of the Annunciation sculptures (completed 1426–28) in the church of St Mary Magdalen (Église Sainte-Marie-Madelei) in Tournai, polychromed by the painter Robert Campin. (Note: Mary's tomb contains many references to her mother including Isabella's escutcheon (heraldry shield). The arrangements of the angels and the effigies are of a similar form; having been built by van Thienen and Borman's son, Jan Borman the Younger.)

== Provenance ==
The tomb was ruined during the Iconoclast Fury of 1566 when it was badly damaged and broken apart by looters, and many of the original 24 bronze statuettes were destroyed or stolen. The remaining 10 appear in c. 1691 inventory of Jan de Vos of Amsterdam and are recorded as having passed to his son Pieter de Vos in 1691. The statuettes were held in the Cabinet of Curiosities in the Amsterdam Town Hall (Prinsenhof) between 1808 and 1887. They have been on loan to the Rijksmuseum since 1887. The effigy is now in the Cathedral of Our Lady, Antwerp.

The effigy and remaining mourners were brought together in 2021 as part of the Rijksmuseum's Vergeet me niet ('Forget me not' or 'Remember me') exhibition.

== Description ==
=== Effigy ===
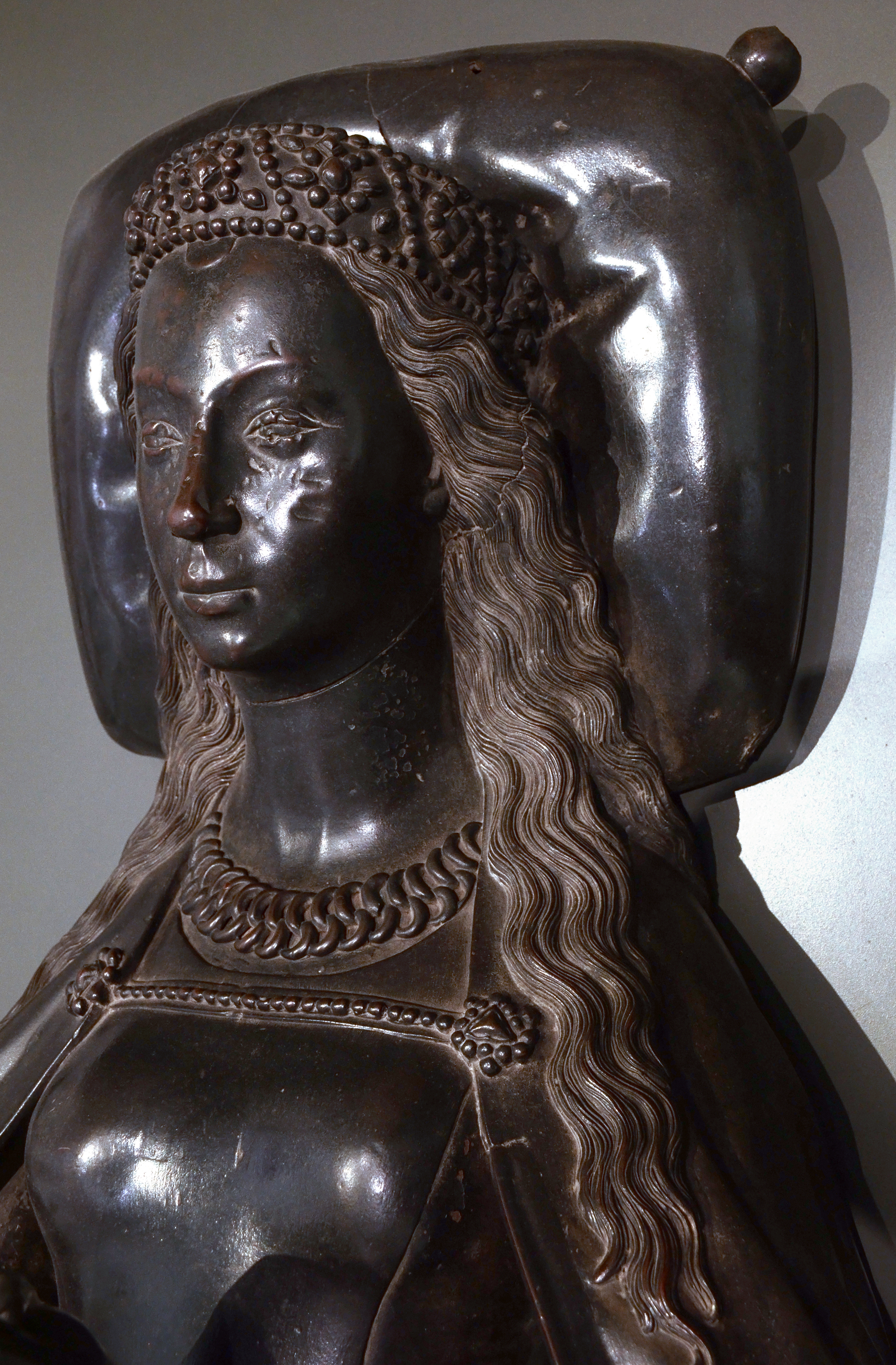
Detail of Isabella's effigy

Isabella's effigy is in bronze and shows her head placed on a cushion and her hands joined in prayer. Her eyes are open and she has long, wavy hair. She is wearing expensive jewellery and fashionable clothing, including a diadem (a type of banded crown). Common to other tomb sculptures from the Burgundian court, the two small dogs at her feet represent her fidelity to her marriage. Like the mourners, her face is not a faithful or "true" representation, but is instead idealised.

As with the mourners, the effigy's polychrome is lost, but its structure is in reasonable condition. Her hands are modern replacements.

=== Mourners ===
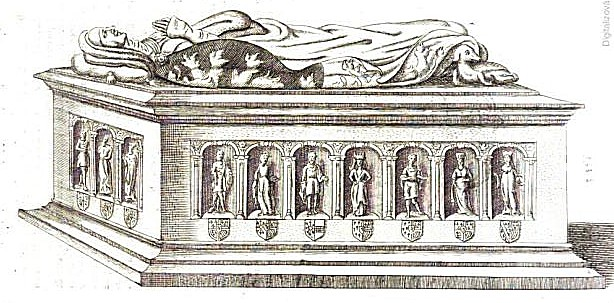
1641 drawing of the Tomb of Joan of Brabant, destroyed in 1607. Attributed to Jacob van Gerines and Jean de le Mer. Polychromed (painted over) by Rogier van der Weyden

The mourners are made from bronze coated with black lacquer patina and have an average height of 55 cm (22 in). A number are partially damaged, including the man wearing a fur hat who is missing his left hand. The base of each contains Roman numerals in white paint added while at the Prinsenhof as markings to indicate the order in which they were to be placed. While the Rijksmuseum orders the ten surviving mourners, alphabetically (A–J), the original arrangement of 24 figures was probably eight on either long-side and two in both short-sides.

Each represents one of Isabella's ancestors, all of whom had died centuries earlier. Their likenesses were directly copied from the near identical but now lost tombs of Louis II, Count of Flanders (also known as Louis de Mâle; died 1384) and of Joan of Brabant (died 1406). Both of the earlier tombs were destroyed during the 1607 bombardment of Brussels but are known from drawings and written descriptions.

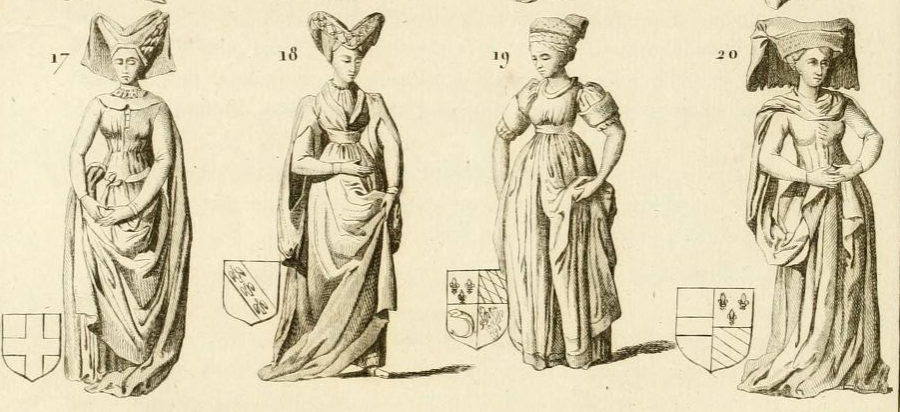
Figures from Margaret of Brabant's tomb, including figures whose headdresses and robes resemble specific figures on Isabelle's tomb.

Of the ten surviving mourners, eight are copies of figures from de Mâle and Brabant's tombs. Two of the figures (A and B) have been identified. Figure A has a cross of Saint Anthony the Great around his neck, and depicts her great-grandfather Albrecht of Bavaria (1336–1404). Figure B wears an imperial crown and holds an orb (then a symbol of sovereignty) and represents her great-great-grandfather Louis of Bavaria (died 1384).

The male figures are shown in more active poses, including their legs being shown in mid-step. They hold a number of objects to reflect their high status, including an org or sphere (figure A). The women's clothing reflects fashions popular amongst Burgundian nobles in the early 15th century. Their sleeves and robes are exceptionally long, and most of the women have tightly pinned or shaven hairlines, reflecting the 15th-century fashions evident from portraits by Rogier van der Weyden and Petrus Christus. The female weepers are dressed in expensive and luxurious clothing, in particular figure I's houppelande spills and gathers on the floor; an excess indicating her wealth and status. Figure H has a partially shaved head and turban decorated with rows of pearls and a brooch. Two females wear houppelandes – long dresses with a full body and wide sleeves.

The following naming conventions follow the Rijksmuseum's catalogue numbering:

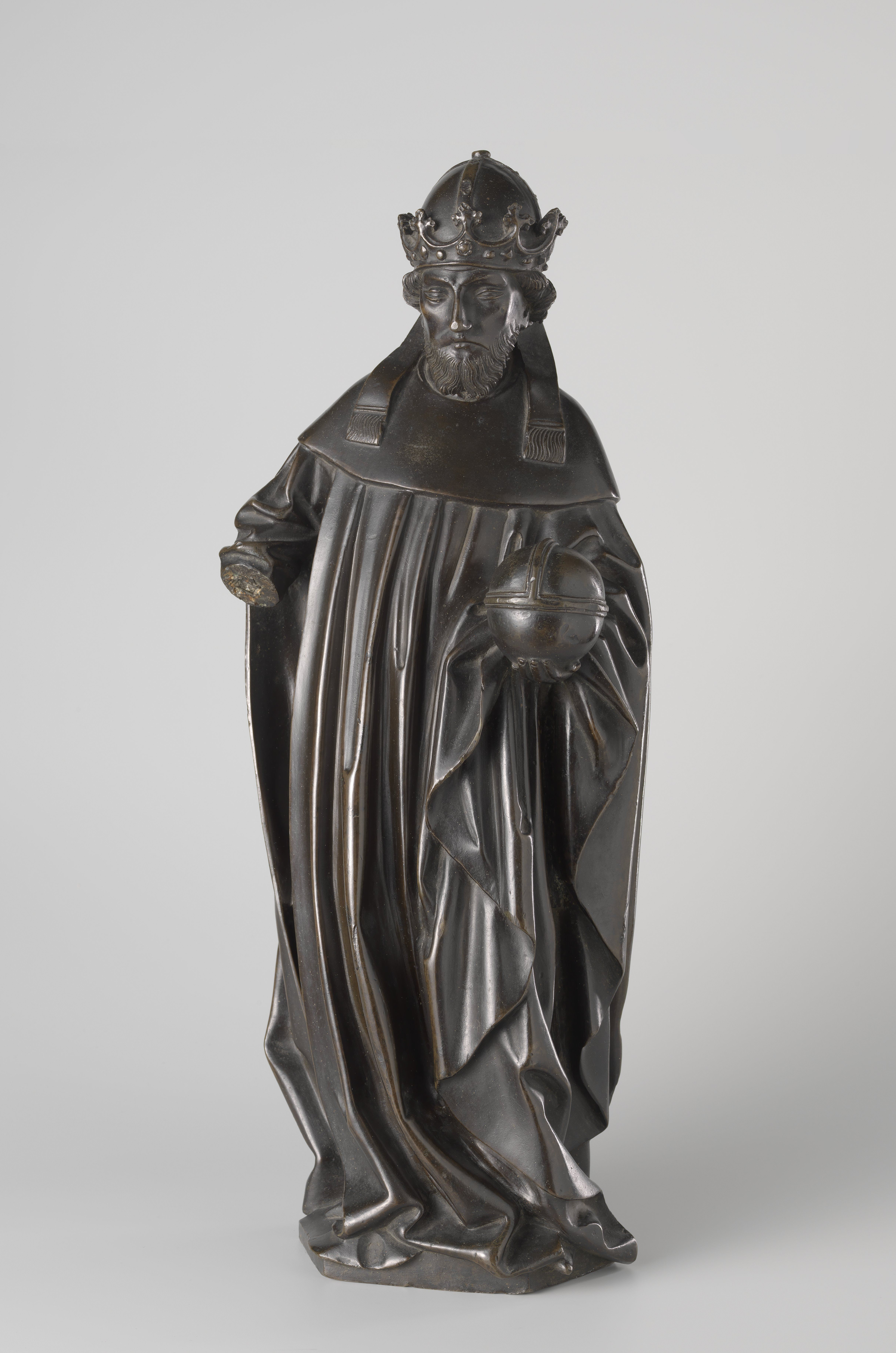
Figure A: Louis of Bavaria (d. 1384), wearing an imperial crown and holding an orb. Originally placed at front left.

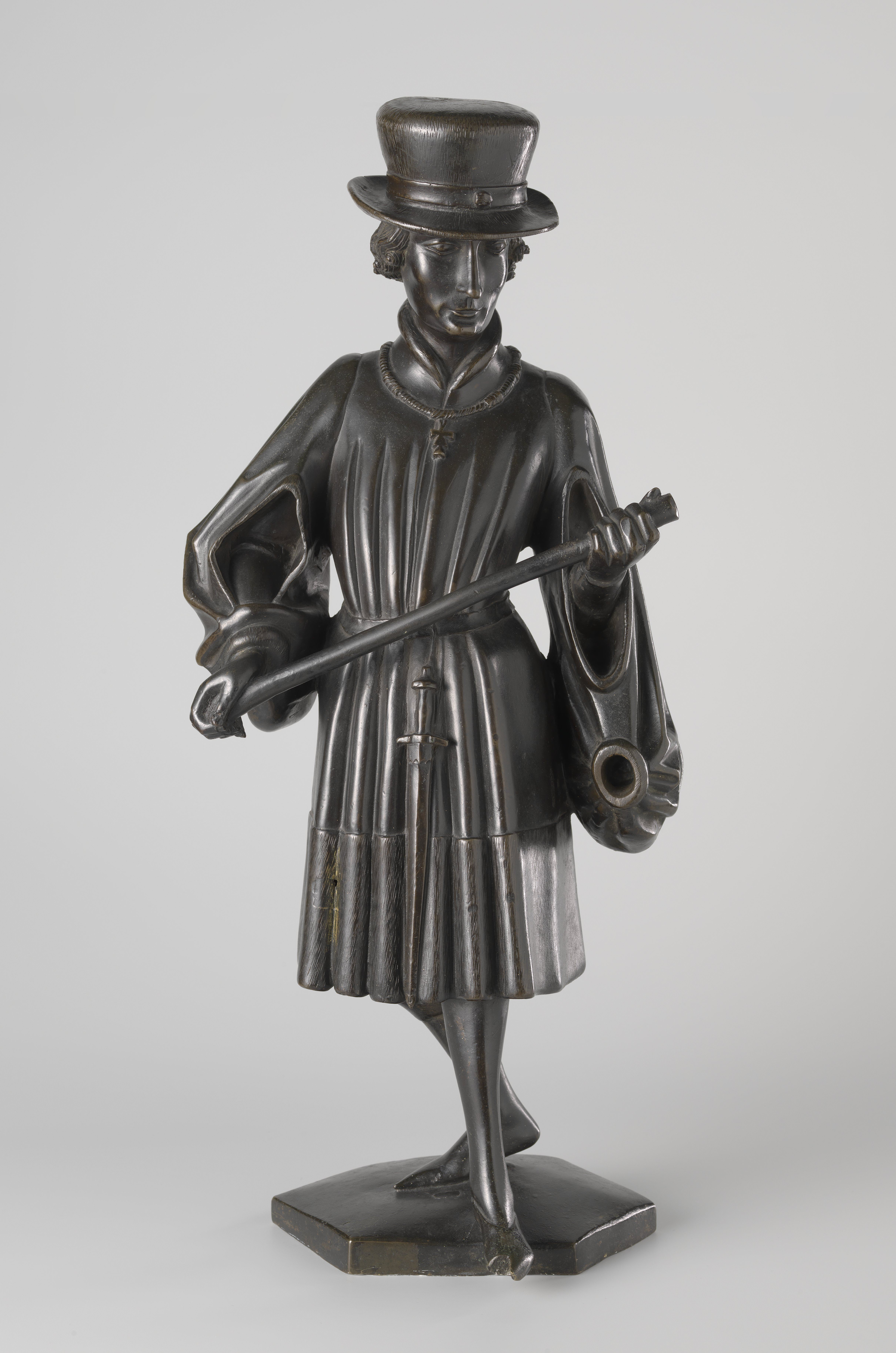
Figure B: Albrecht of Bavaria (d. 1404) holding a staff. He wears a fur hat and a houppelande with fur trimmings.

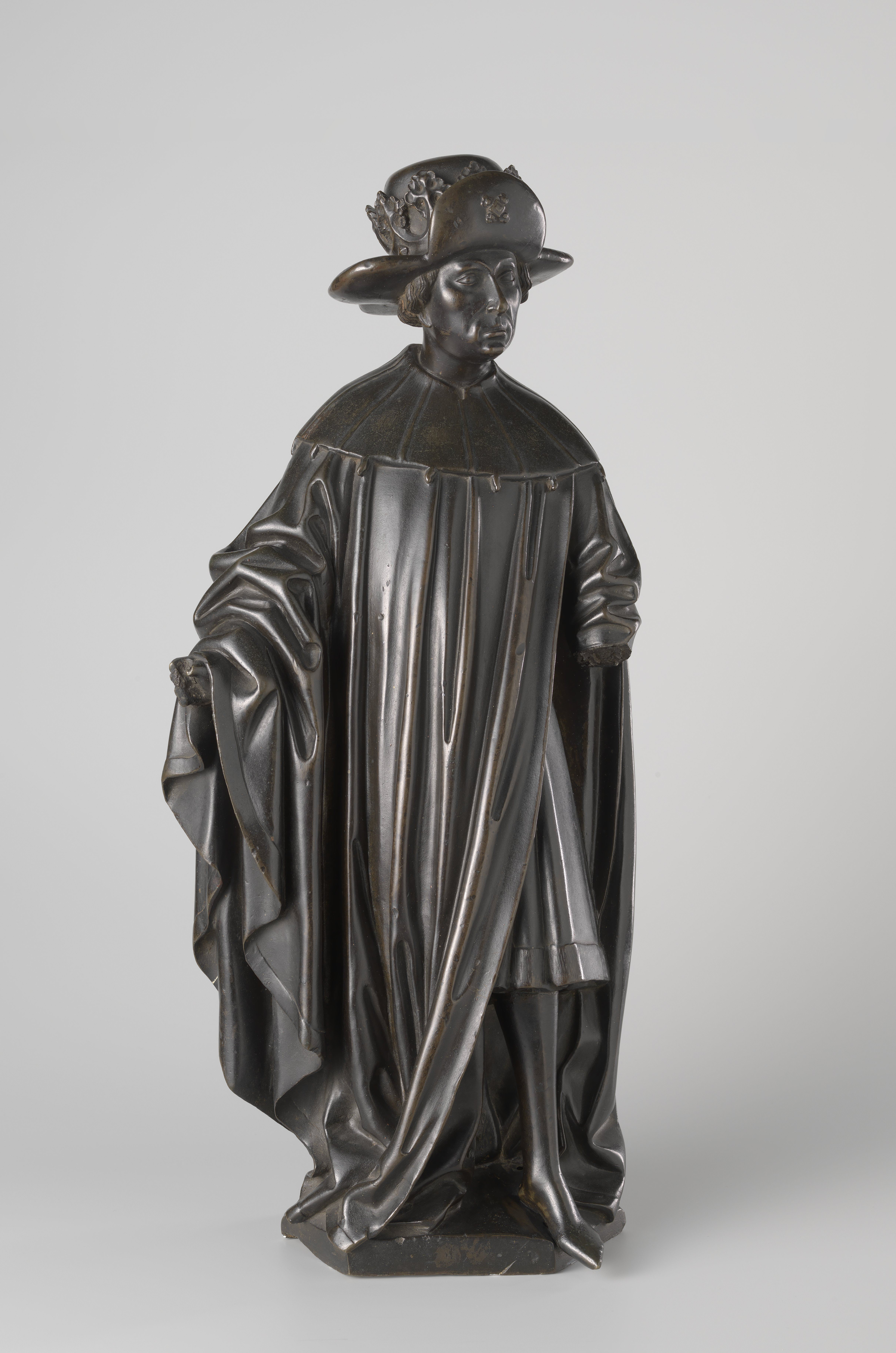
Figure C: Man wearing a fur hat and crown with a large central jewel. An ermine insignia of the Golden Fleece is attached to his collar. His left arm is lost.

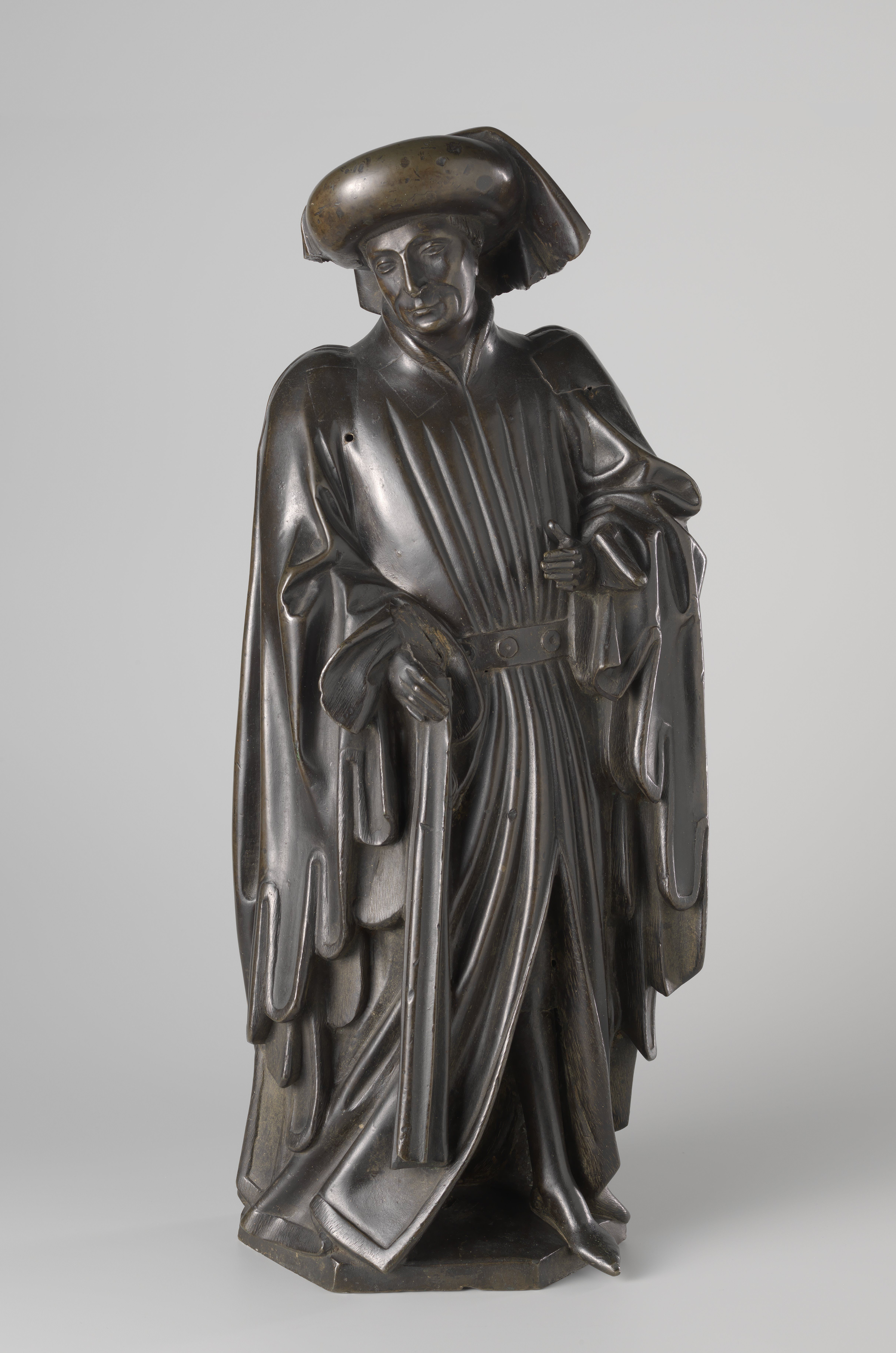
Figure D: Figure wearing a crown. He has a long cloak and fur hat with a full-length hanging fla.

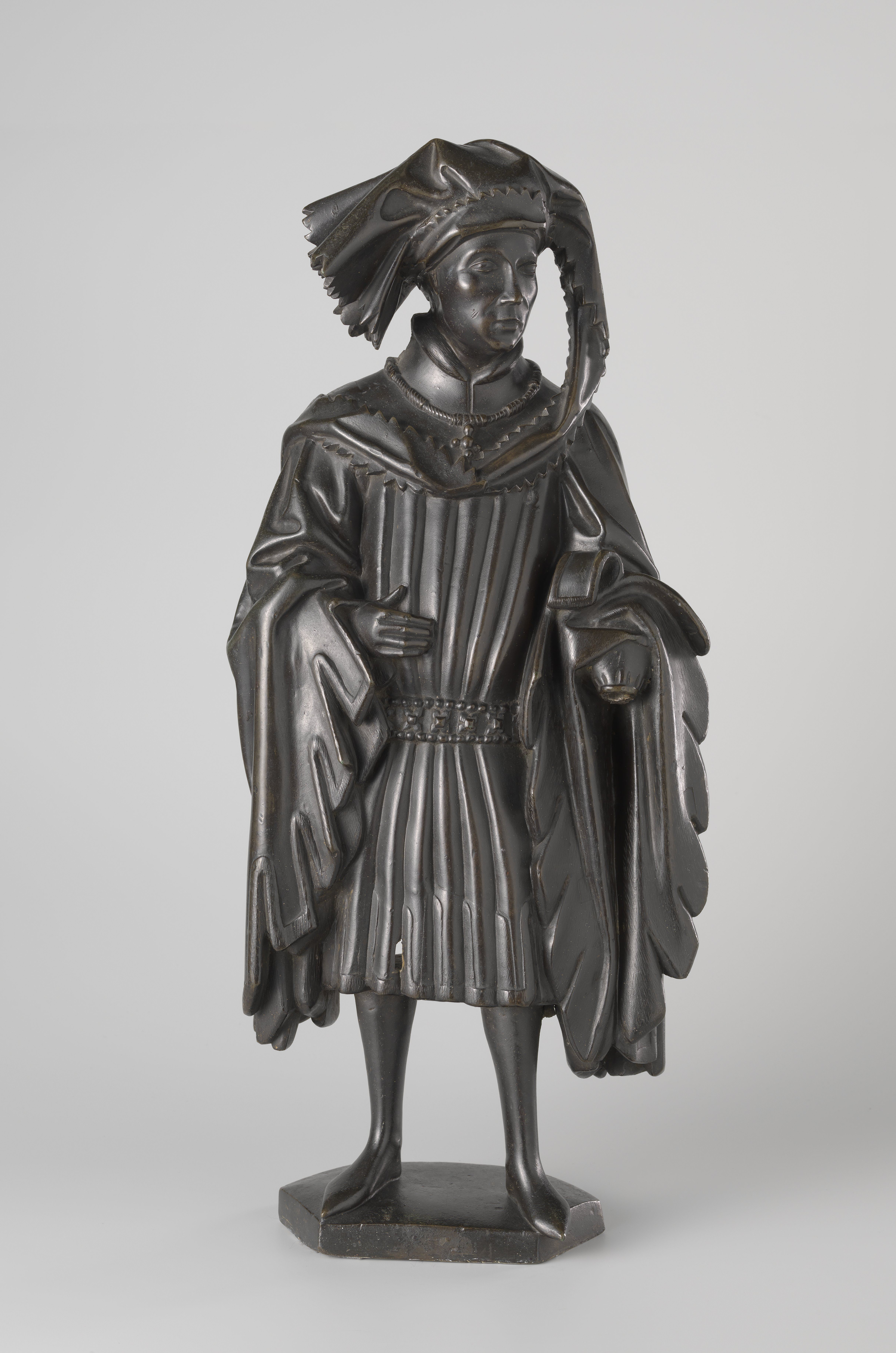
Figure E: Man wearing a chaperon (an elaborate hood popular in the mid-15th century). He has an elaborately ornamented belt, and his sleeves are unusually wide and flare at their ends. The cross around his neck reflects the Order of St. Anthony.

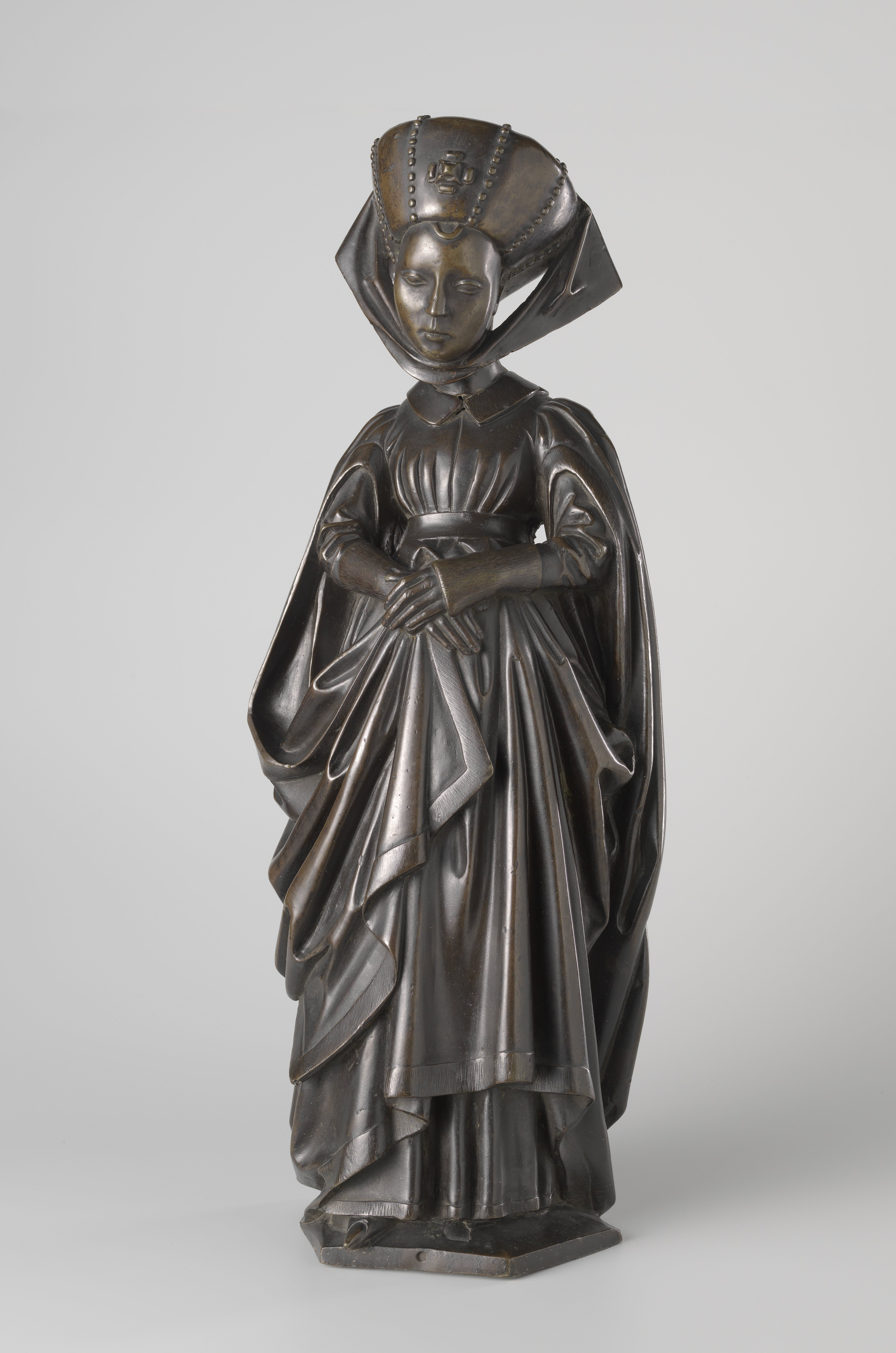
Figure F: Woman with crossed hands and a shaved hairline. She is dressed in a turban decorated with vertical rows of pearls, and a large jewel at front.

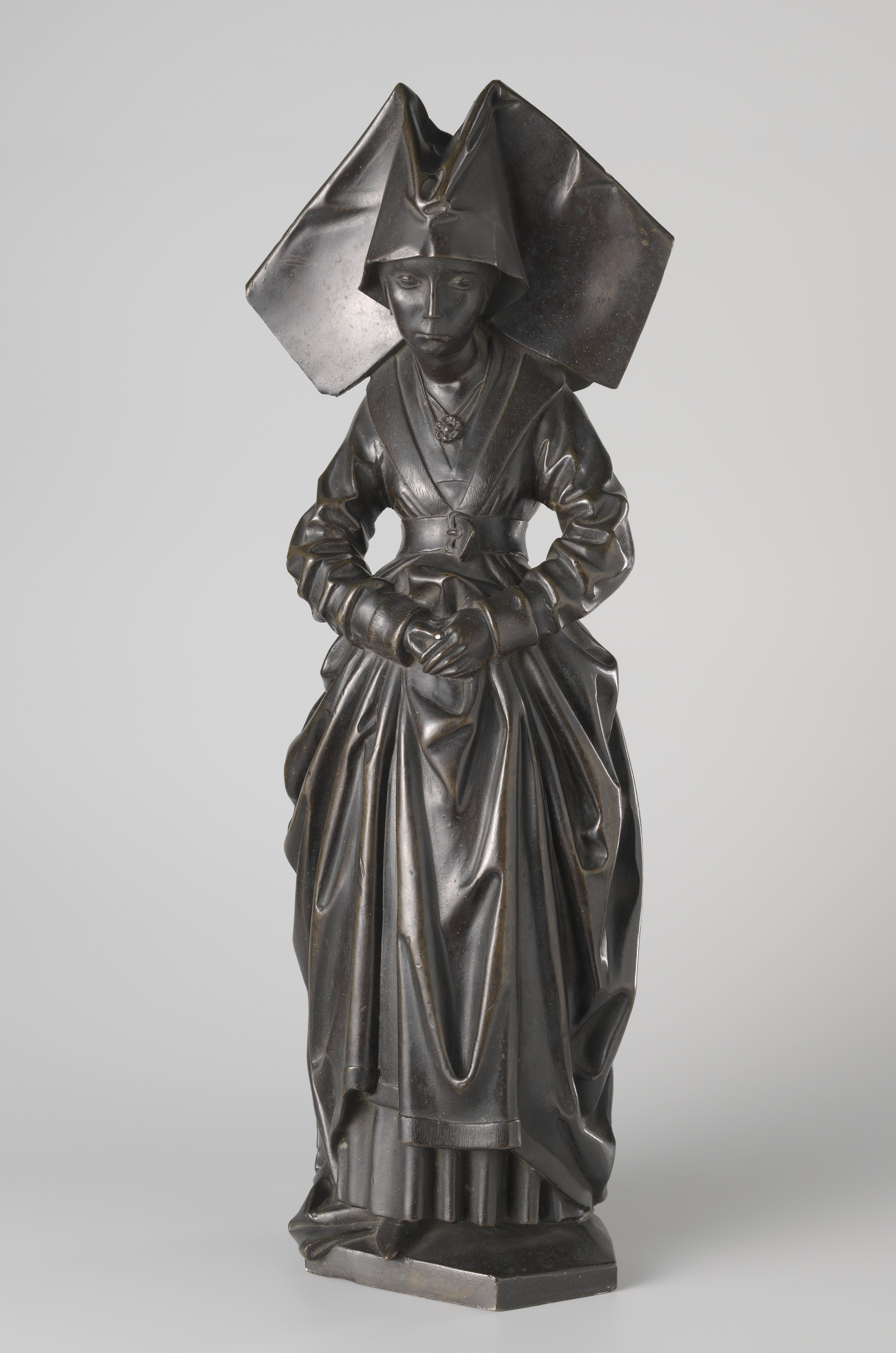
Figure G: Mourner with a linen truncated hennin. She has a v-shaped neckline, and wears a rose around her neck.

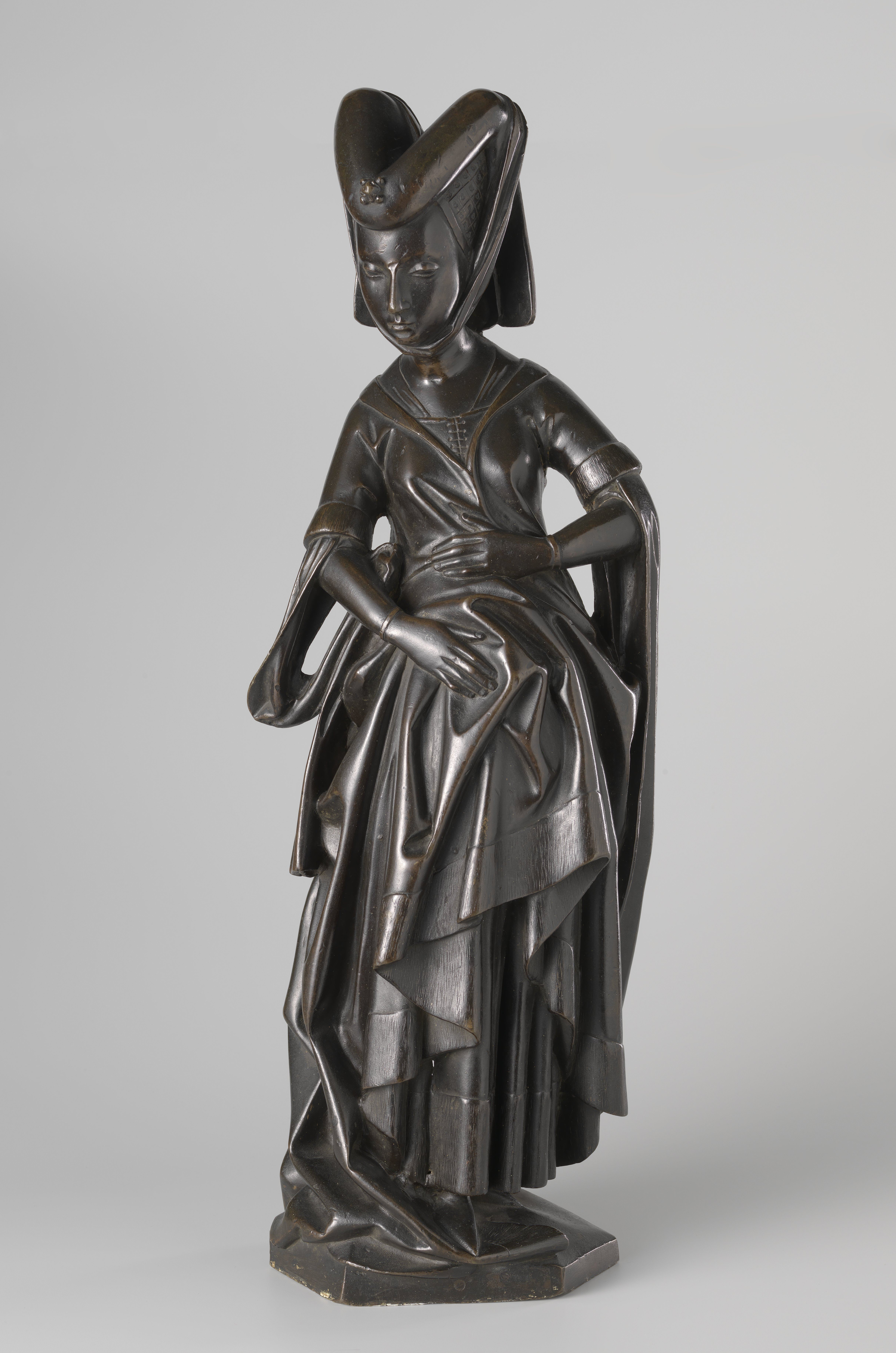
Figure H: Woman wearing a veil and v-shaped bourrelet decorated with pearls. The sleeves and hem of the dress are trimmed with fur.

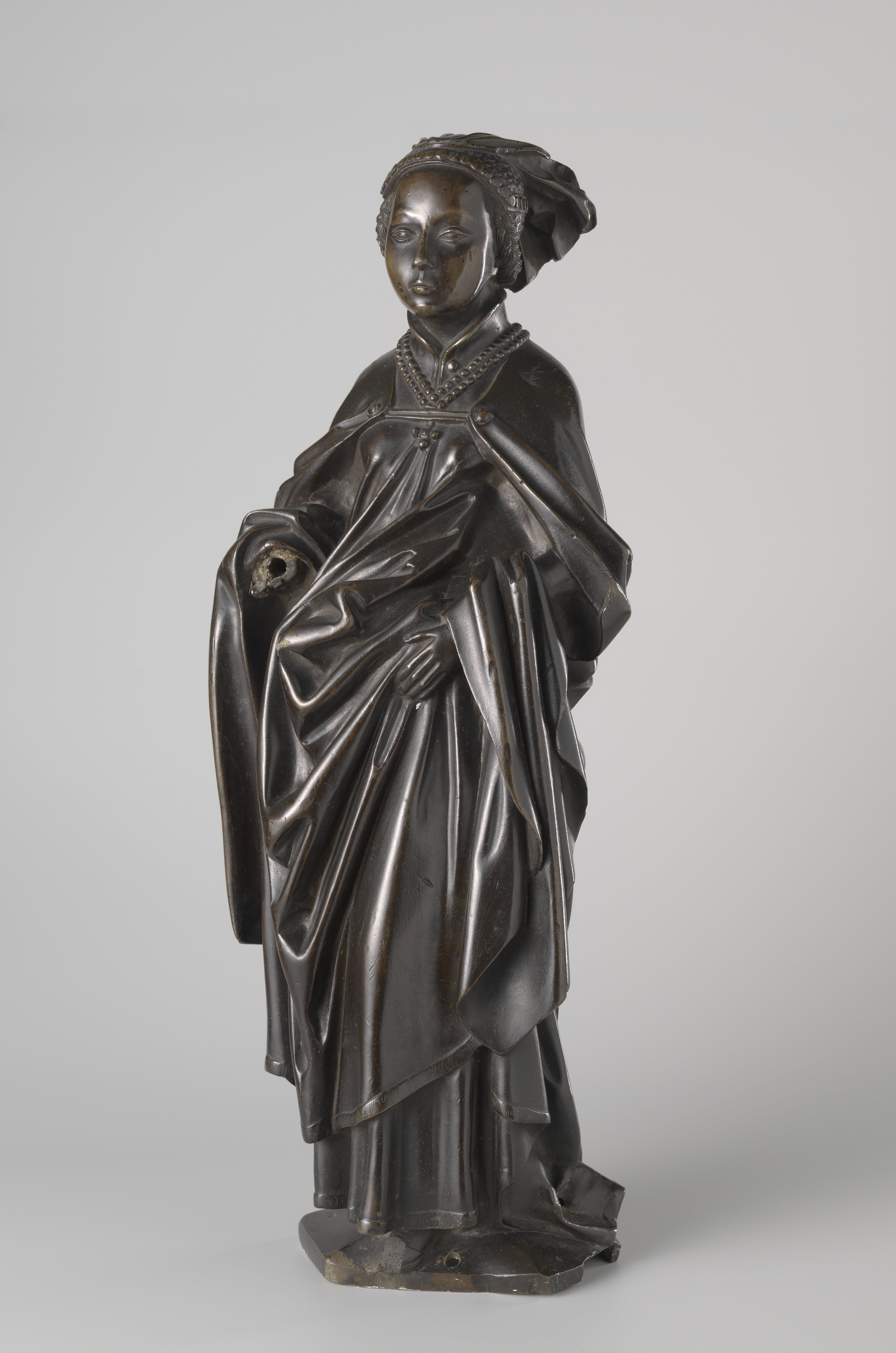
Figure I: Mourner with braided hair and a hanging veil. She wears a houppelande and a cloak tied with a band on her upper chest.

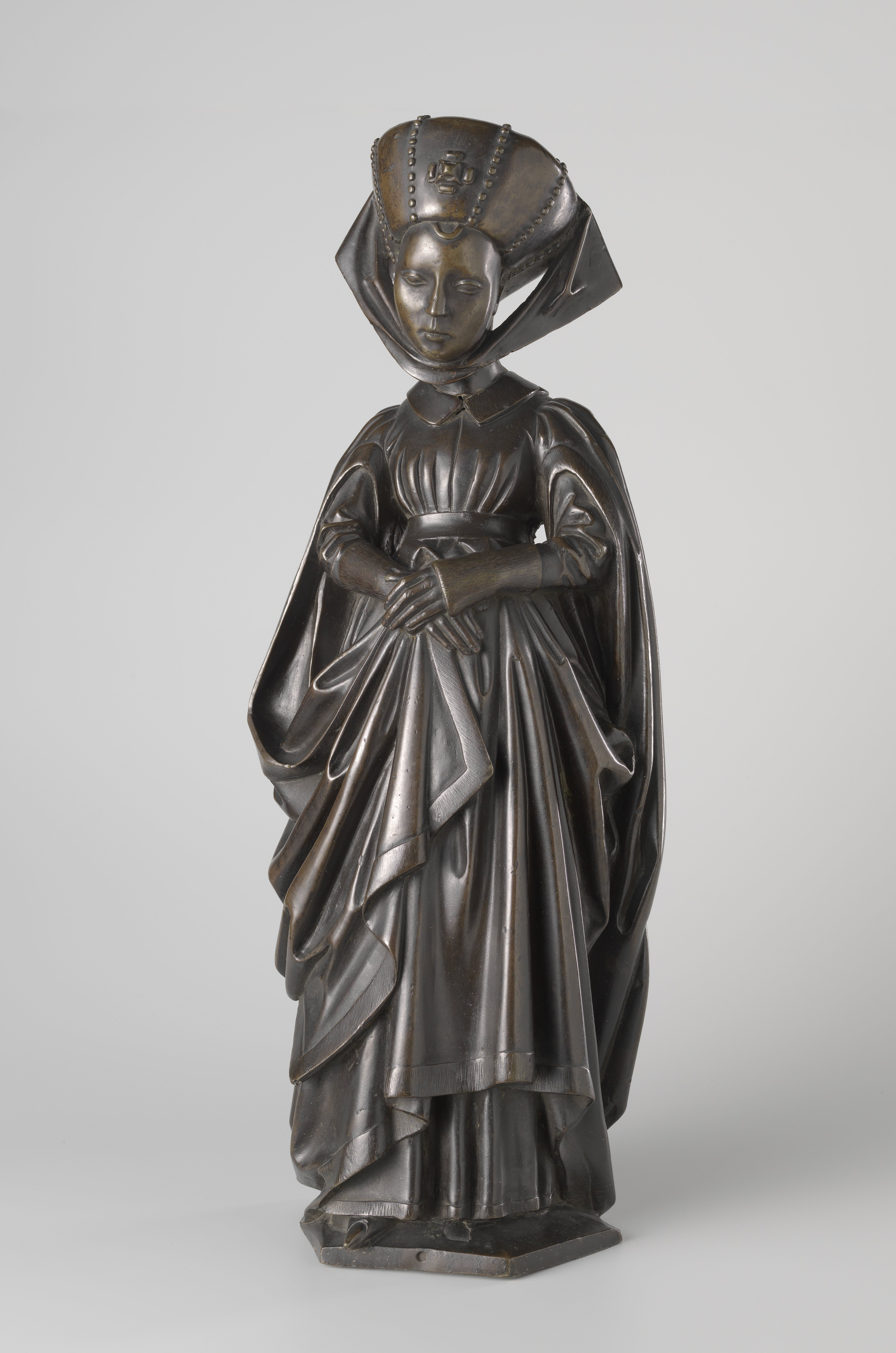
Figure J: Woman wearing a bourrelet with lappets. (originally placed at front right)

== See also ==
- 1300–1400 in fashion
- 1400–1500 in fashion

== Sources ==
- Adams, Ann; Barker, Jessica (eds). "Revisiting the Monument: Fifty Years Since Panofsky’s Tomb Sculpture Archived 2025-03-29 at the Wayback Machine". London: Courtauld Institute of Art, 2016
- Armstrong, Charles Arthur John. "The Burgundian Netherlands, 1477−1521", in: Potter, George Richard (ed), The New Cambridge Modern History volume I. Cambridge: Cambridge University Press, 1957. ISBN 978-0-5210-4541-4
- Arnade, Peter (ed). "Rereading Huizinga: Autumn of the Middle Ages, a Century Later". Amsterdam: Amsterdam University Press, 2019. ISBN 978-9-0485-3409-8
- Campbell, Lorne. "The Tomb of Joanna, Duchess of Brabant". Renaissance Studies, volume. 2, no. 2, 1988. JSTOR 24409392
- Davenport, Millia. The Book of Costume. New York: Crown, 1948
- Jackson Harvey, Mary. "Death and Dynasty in the Bouillon Tomb Commissions". The Art Bulletin, volume 74, no. 2, June 1992. JSTOR 3045872
- Jugie, Sophie. The Mourners: Tomb Sculpture from the Court of Burgundy . Paris: 1; First Edition, 2010. ISBN 978-0-3001-5517-4
- Kiening, Christian. "Rhétorique de la perte. L'exemple de la mort d'Isabelle de Bourbon (1465)". Médiévales, no. 27, 1994. JSTOR 43026850
- Mikolic, Amanda. "Fashionable Mourners: Bronze Statuettes from the Rijksmuseum" (exhibition catalogue). Cleveland, OH: Cleveland Museum of Art, 2017
- Morganstern, Anne McGee. "Gothic Tombs of Kinship in France, the Low Countries, and England". University Park: Pennsylvania State University Press, 2000. ISBN 978-0-2710-1859-1
- Nash, Susie. Northern Renaissance art. Oxford: Oxford University Press, 2008. ISBN 978-0-1928-4269-5
- Panofsky, Ervin. Tomb Sculpture: Its Changing Aspects from Ancient Egypt to Bernini. London: Harry Abrams, 1964. ISBN 978-0-8109-3870-0
- Perkinson, Stephen. "From an "Art De Memoire" to the Art of Portraiture: Printed Effigy Books of the Sixteenth Century". The Sixteenth Century Journal, volume 33, no. 3m Autumn 2002. JSTOR 4144020
- Roberts, Ann. "The Chronology and Political Significance of the Tomb of Mary of Burgundy". The Art Bulletin, volume 71, no. 3, 1989. JSTOR 3051135
- Scholten, Frits. "Isabella’s Weepers: Ten Statues from a Burgundian Tomb"'. Amsterdam: Rijksmuseum, 2007. ISBN 978-9-07145-0822
