= Saint Anthony, Missouri =

Unincorporated community in Missouri, U.S.

Coordinates: 38°09′20″N 92°16′27″W

Saint Anthony is an unincorporated community in eastern Miller County, in the U.S. state of Missouri. The community is located on Missouri Route A, west of Missouri Route 42 and above Tavern Creek. Brays is on Route 42 to the east and Iberia is 5.5 miles to the south-southwest.

== History ==
A post office called Saint Anthony was established in 1907, and remained in operation until 1929. The community took its name from a local Roman Catholic church of the same name, which in turn was named after Anthony of Padua.
