= Tavern Creek (Osage River tributary) =

Stream in the U.S. state of Missouri

Tavern Creek is a stream in Miller and Pulaski counties in the U.S. state of Missouri. It is a tributary of the Osage River. The stream headwaters are at 37°54′42″N 92°22′19″W and the confluence with the Osage is at 38°19′04″N 92°17′24″W.

The stream headwaters arise in Pulaski County north of Missouri Route 133 just to the northwest of Swedeborg and it flows northeast and north passing under Missouri Route U about two miles west of Crocker. The stream enters Miller County and flows under Missouri Route 17 and passes two miles east of Iberia. It flows under Missouri Route 42 and passes west of the communities of Brays and St. Anthony. It meanders north past the east side of St. Elizabeth and enters the Osage within the Osage-Tavern Wildlife Area.

Tavern Creek was named either from a corruption of the French caverne, meaning "cave" or, as water and game were so abundant there, the pioneers likened the stream to a tavern.

== See also ==
- List of rivers of Missouri
