= St. Anthony's fire =

St. Anthony's fire (also known historically as Ignis Sacer and Holy Fire) may refer to:

== Diseases ==
- Ergotism, the effect of long-term ergot poisoning, traditionally due to the ingestion of alkaloids
- Erysipelas, an acute infection, typically with a skin rash
- Shingles, a painful viral disease, also called herpes zoster

== Other ==
- St Anthony's Fire (novel), a 1994 Doctor Who novel by Mark Gatiss

== See also ==
- Saint Anthony (disambiguation)
- St. Elmo's fire, a weather phenomenon
