= Sankt Anton =

Sankt Anton (“Saint Anthony”) may refer to the following places in Austria:

- Sankt Anton am Arlberg, a municipality and ski resort in Tyrol
- Sankt Anton im Montafon, a municipality in Vorarlberg
- Sankt Anton an der Jeßnitz, a municipality in Lower Austria
