= St Anthony's College =

St Anthony's College may refer to:

- St Antony's College, Oxford, England
- St. Anthony's College, Kandy, Central Province, Sri Lanka
- St. Anthony's College, Mijas, Andalusia, Spain
- St. Anthony's College, Wattala, Sri Lanka
- St Anthony's College, Leuven, Belgium
- St. Anthony's College, San Jose de Buenavista, Antique, Philippines

== See also ==
- St. Anthony's School (disambiguation)
- St. Anthony College, Roxas City, Capiz, Philippines
- Saint Anthony (disambiguation)
