= St. Anthony Hospital =

St. Anthony Hospital may refer to:

- St. Anthony Hospital (Colorado)
- St. Anthony Hospital (Columbus, Ohio)
- St. Anthony Hospital (Oklahoma City)
- St. Anthony Hospital (Pendleton, Oregon)
- St. Anthony Hospital (Gig Harbor, Washington)
- Saint Anthony Hospital (Milwaukee, Wisconsin)

== See also ==
- St. Anthony's Hospital (disambiguation)
