= Pleurants =

Tomb decorations

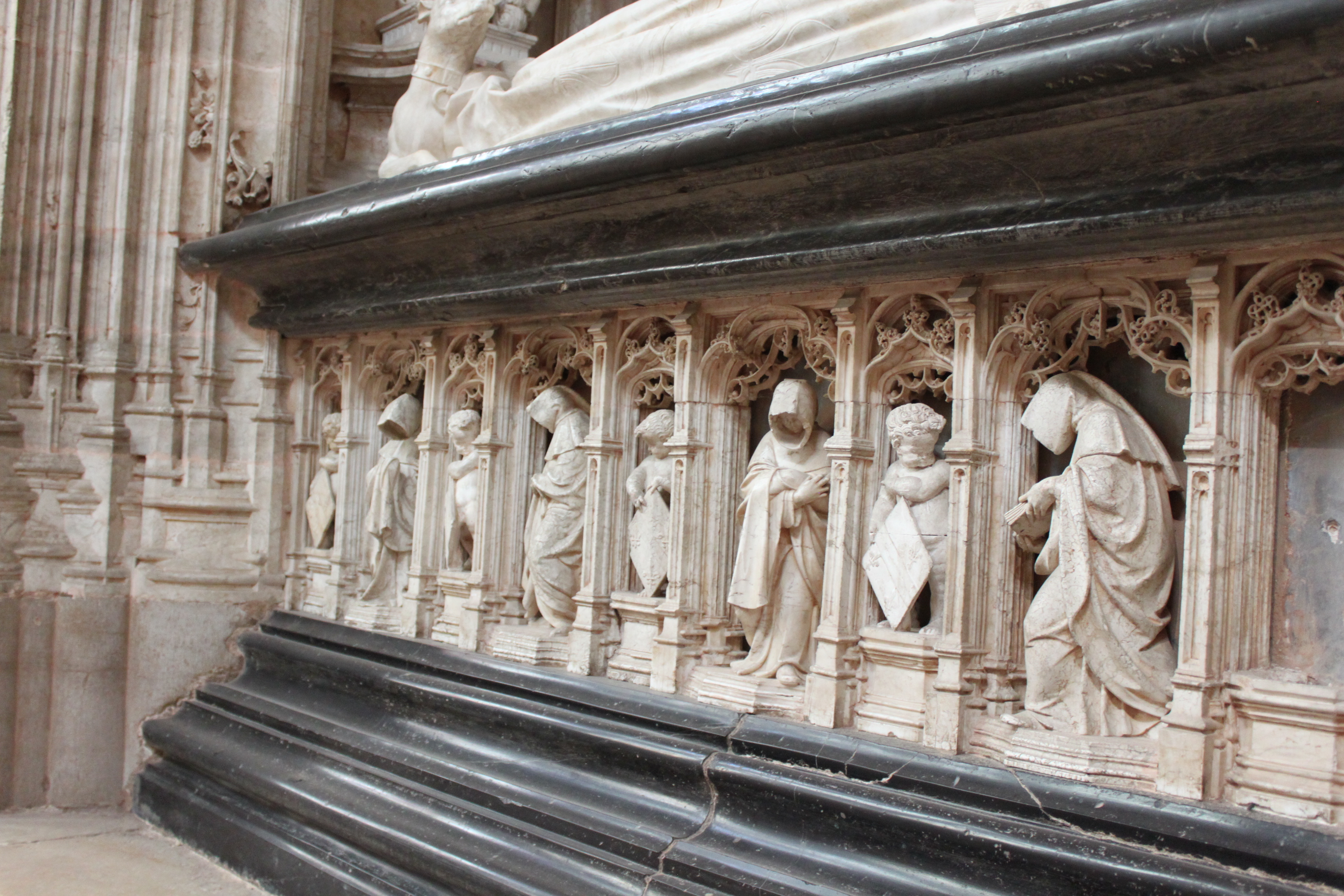
Pleurants of Margaret of Bourbon (1438–1483) in the Royal Monastery of Brou, in Bourg-en-Bresse, France, by Conrad Meit

Pleurants or weepers (the English meaning of pleurants) are anonymous, sculpted figures representing mourners, used to decorate elaborate tomb monuments, mostly in Western Europe during the late Middle Ages. Typically they are relatively small, and a group were placed around the sides of a raised tomb monument, perhaps interspersed with armorial decoration, or carrying shields with this. They may be in relief or free-standing. In English usage, the term "weepers" is sometimes extended to cover the small figures of the deceased's children, often seen kneeling beneath the tomb effigy in Tudor tomb monuments.

These figures represent the mourners, who pray for the deceased standing during the funeral procession. Because many of the original tombs have been vandalised or destroyed, relatively few examples remain to be studied. Many figures have been detached from their original context, which is not always known.

In the 16th and 17th century the practice of placing anonymous pleurant figures disappeared, although the group at Brou for Margaret of Bourbon were not begun until 1526 at the earliest. But these were commissioned over 40 years after her death by her daughter, along with tombs for herself and her husband, and reflected the taste of Margaret's lifetime.

== Britain ==
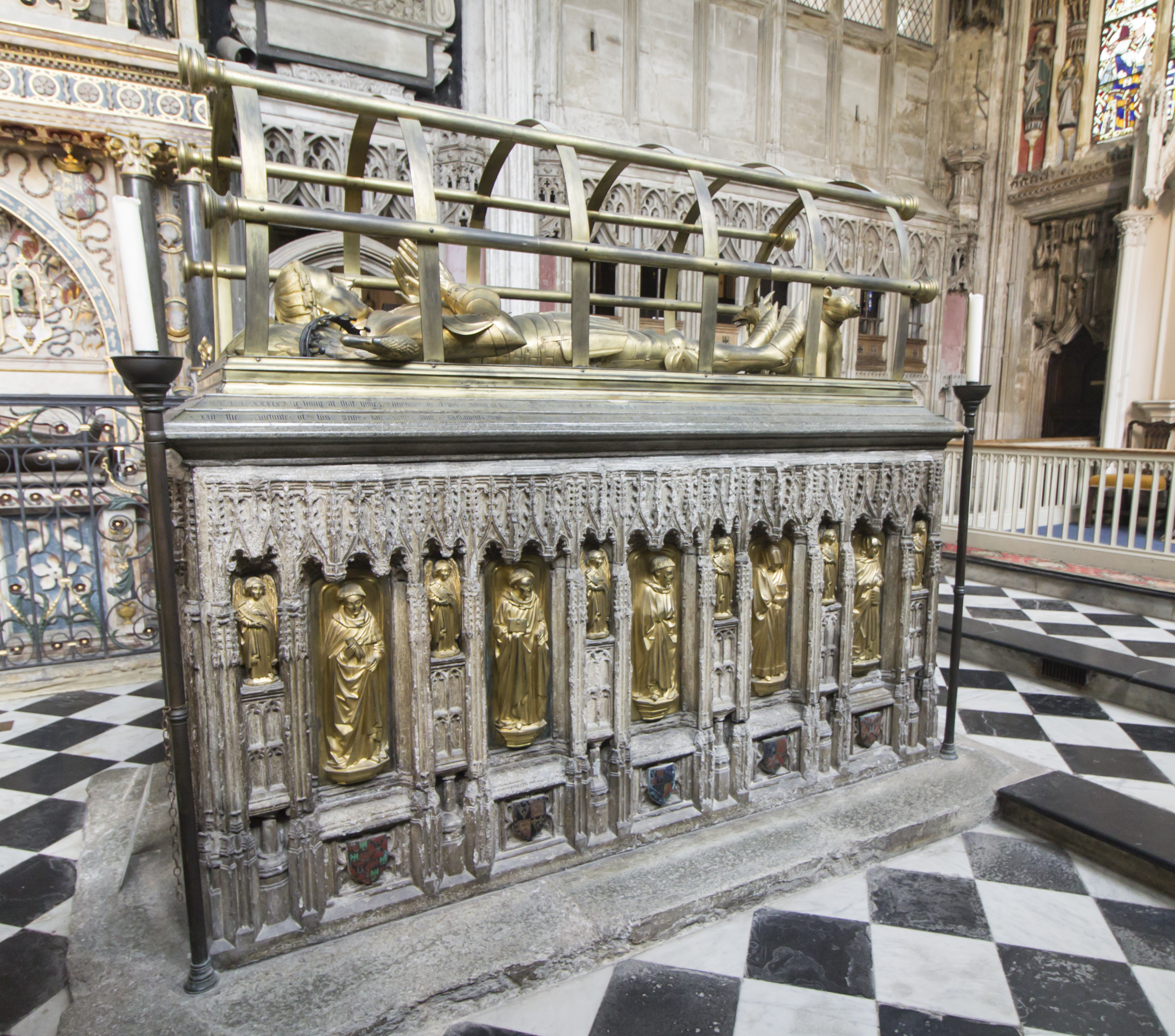
Effigy of Richard Beauchamp, 13th Earl of Warwick at the Collegiate Church of St Mary, Warwick

The type began in England in the 13th century, inspired by French examples. The first examples had relief figures set within quatrefoil frames, as in the tomb now used for Henry Marshal, Bishop of Exeter (d. 1206) in Exeter Cathedral.

The first recorded use of the English word is in a contract relating to the construction of the very grand tomb of Richard Beauchamp, 13th Earl of Warwick, who died in 1437 in France, though the contract is some time later, and the weepers were made in 1452–53. This has the effigy and weepers in gilt-bronze, and still stands in the Collegiate Church of St Mary, Warwick, with the "xiv images embossed of lords and ladyes in divers verstures, called weepers", standing in niches around the sides, that were specified.

== Franco-Burgundian examples ==
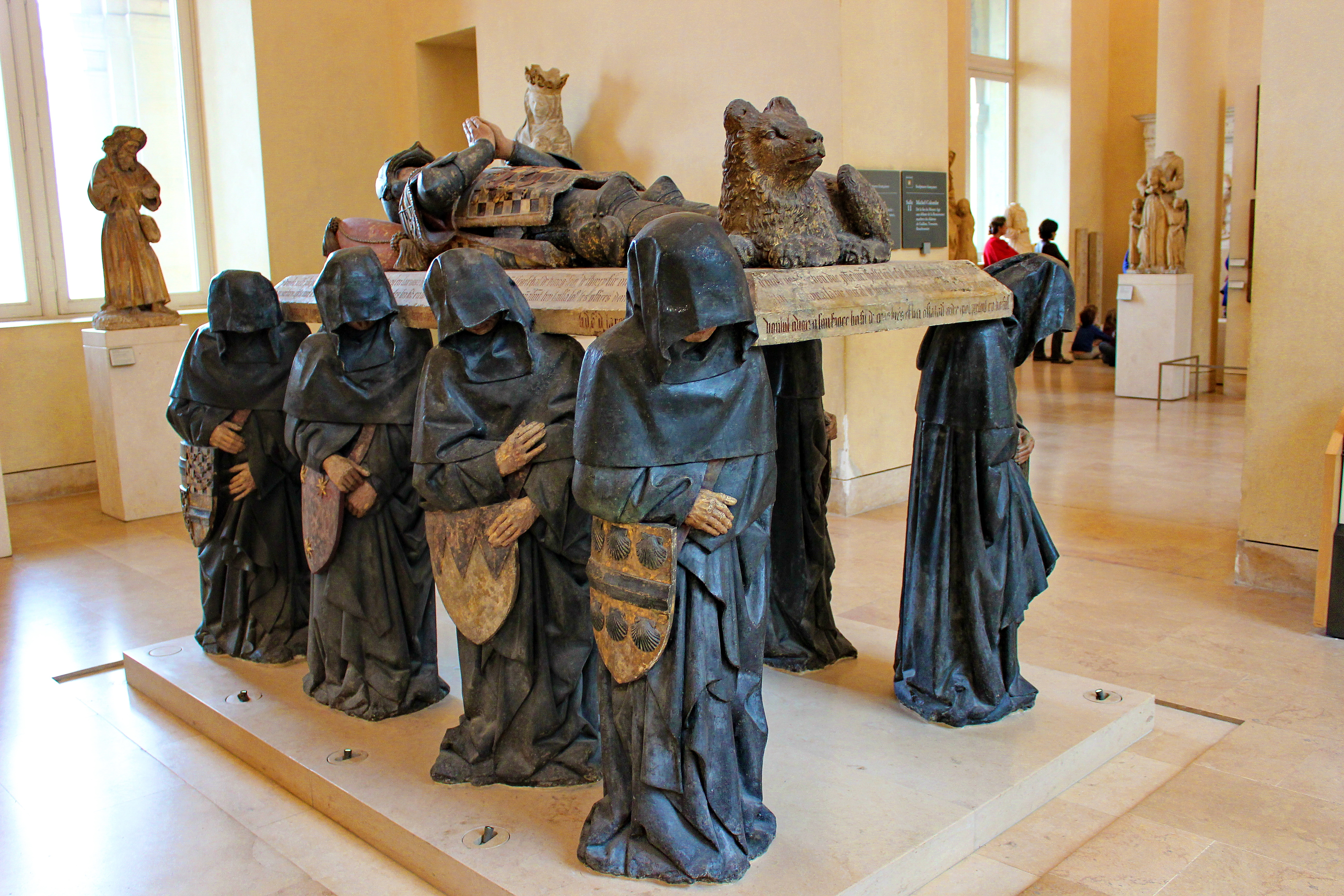
Life-sized pleurants from the tomb of Philippe Pot, Louvre, Paris

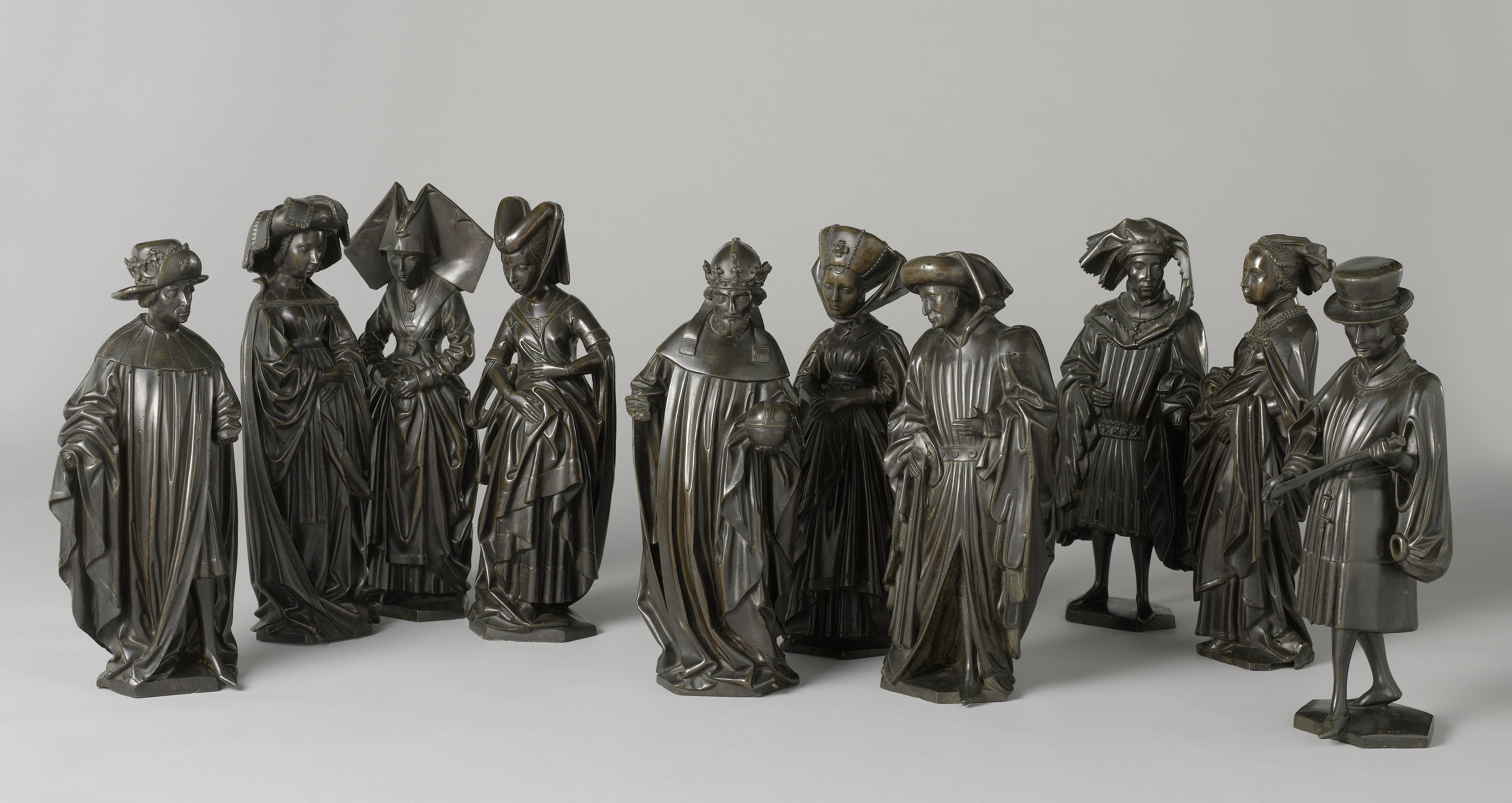
Pleurants from the Tomb of Isabella of Bourbon, Rijksmuseum, Amsterdam

On the Continent they are especially a feature of the tombs of Franco-Burgundian royalty, imitated by some grand nobles. The tomb at Royaumont Abbey of Louis of France (1244–1260), son of Louis IX of France, appears to have popularized the type. Here a side of the chest below the effigy shows eight walking figures in relief in an arcade, led by two mitred clerics. One end of the chest had a relief of the dead prince, covered by a cloth that leaves his face exposed, being carried by four bearers.

- Mourners of Dijon, 15th century: originally there were 82 mourners.
- Tomb of Isabella of Bourbon, originally in Saint Michael's Abbey.
- Pleurants of Marguerite of Bourbon, Royal Monastery of Brou, by Conrad Meit.
- Tomb of Philippe Pot, possibly created by Antoine Le Moiturier.
- Tomb of Philip the Bold at the Palace of the Dukes of Burgundy at Dijon.
- Pleurants of John, Duke of Berry
- Pleurant of Bertholomey, Antwerp.

== See also ==
Various, mainly Eastern saints are also known as weepers, by byname or common epithet.

- Mary Magdalene
- Thalilæus
