= St. Anthony Hall (disambiguation) =

St. Anthony Hall is an American social and literary fraternity also known as Delta Psi.

St. Anthony Hall may also refer to:

- St Anthony's Hall, a former medieval guildhall in York, England
- St. Anthony Hall House, historic fraternity house in Philadelphia, Pennsylvania
- Saint Anthony Hall (Hartford, Connecticut), an historic fraternity building in Hartford Connecticut

== See also ==
- Saint Anthony (disambiguation)
