= St. Anthony's School =

St. Anthony's School and variants may refer to:

== Guam ==
- St. Anthony Catholic School, Tamuning GU

== India ==
- St. Anthony's School, Ranchi
- St. Anthony’s Higher Secondary School, Shillong
- St. Anthony's Senior Secondary School, Udaipur

== Malaysia ==
- St. Anthony's School, Teluk Intan

== Pakistan ==
- St. Anthony High School, Lahore

== Singapore ==
- Saint Anthony's Canossian Secondary School, Bedok, Singapore
- Saint Anthony's Primary School, Bukit Batok, Singapore

== Sri Lanka ==
- St. Anthony's College, Kandy

== United Kingdom ==
- St. Anthony's School, Hampstead, London, England
- St. Anthony's Primary School, Craigavon, County Armagh, Northern Ireland

== United States ==
- St. Anthony High School (California)
- St. Anthony School (Florida)
- St. Anthony High School (Wailuku, Hawaii)
- St. Anthony High School (Illinois)
- St. Anthony's Roman Catholic Church, Rectory, Convent, and School, Louisville, Kentucky, listed on the National Register of Historic Places (NRHP)
- St. Anthony High School (Milwaukee), Wisconsin
- St. Anthony Village High School, Minnesota
- St. Anthony's Church and School (Cedar Rapids, Nebraska), NRHP-listed
- St. Anthony High School (New Jersey)
- St. Anthony's High School (South Huntington, New York)
- St. Anthony Catholic High School, Texas

== See also ==
- St Anthony's Girls' Catholic Academy
- St Anthony's College (disambiguation)
- Saint Anthony (disambiguation)
