= Tomb of Joan of Brabant =

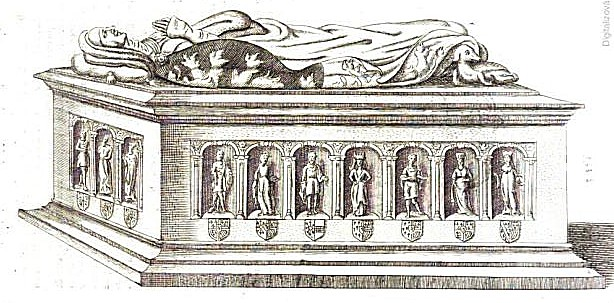
Drawing of the tomb of Margaret of Brabant

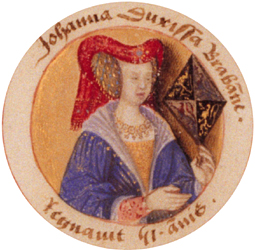
Joan, Duchess of Brabant, Lothier and Limburg

The tomb of Joan of Brabant was built between 1457 and 1458 by the bronze caster Jacob de Gerines after wooden models by the sculptor Jean Delemer, and placed in the church of the Carmelite monastery in Brussels. Joan of Brabant was a Duchess of Brabant and died in 1406.

Joanna was born in 1322 as the daughter of John III, Duke of Brabant and Marie d'Évreux. She was a Duchess of Brabant from 1355 until her death in 1406 at the age of 84. Her will requested that she be buried alongside her mother in an enlarged burial place.

The tomb was commissioned in the 1450s by her great-great-nephew Philip the Good. It was damaged during Calvinist iconoclasm in the years 1578 to 1585 and underwent restoration in 1607, but was destroyed along with the monastery in August 1695 by the French Royal Army during the bombardment of Brussels. Today its form and style are known through a number of drawings and written descriptions.

== Description ==
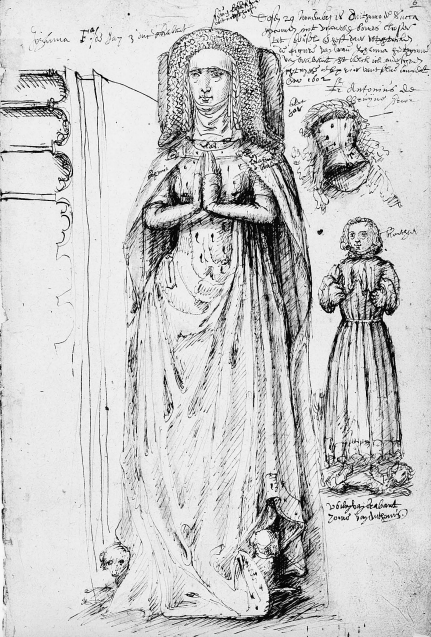
Drawing of the effigy, with Guillaume de Brabant (d. 1410) to right.

The tomb is probably the earliest of the Burgundian-style tombs, whose characteristics include the deceased having naturalised faces, open eyes and angels above their heads. Its design and build is attributed to the casters and sculptors Jacob van Gerines and Jean de le Mer, and its polychrome to the painter Rogier van der Weyden.

The tomb is today known from a number of drawings and written descriptions, the most detailed being from Charles de Rietwyck's 1600 'Sigillographica Belgica and Antoine de Succa's nl 1602 "Memoriaux". Succa also made notes, describing elements such as her blond hair and the coat of arms on her cloak. De Rietwyck's notes detail that at the time, the tomb was positioned in the middle of the church's choir, that its epitaph was engraved on copper, and that it was 4 feet high, 10 feet long and 8 feet wide.

Examining the various descriptions and drawings, the art historian Lorne Campbell believes the tomb was similar that of Louis II, Count of Flanders (d. 1384).

== Influence ==
The rows of mourners positioned below the slab were reproduced in several later Burgundian funerary monuments, most notably on the tomb of Isabella of Bourbon, constructed between 1475 and 1476 with the mourners being directly copied from Joan's monument.

== Sources ==
- Adams, Ann; Barker, Jessica (eds). "Revisiting the Monument: Fifty Years Since Panofsky's Tomb Sculpture". London: Courtauld Institute of Art, 2016
- Campbell, Lorne. "The Tomb of Joanna, Duchess of Brabant". Renaissance Studies, volume 2, no. 2, 1988. JSTOR 24409392
- Jugie, Sophie. The Mourners: Tomb Sculpture from the Court of Burgundy. New Haven, CT: Yale University Press, 2010. ISBN 978-0-3001-5517-4
- Panofsky, Erwin. Tomb Sculpture: Its Changing Aspects from Ancient Egypt to Bernini. London: Harry Abrams, 1964. ISBN 978-0-8109-3870-0
- Panofsky, Erwin. Early Netherlandish Painting, Its Origins and Character. Boston, MA: Harvard University Press, 1953
- Scholten, Frits. "Isabella's Weepers: Ten Statues from a Burgundian Tomb"'. Amsterdam: Rijksmuseum, 2007. ISBN 978-9-07145-0822
- Silver, Larry. Marketing Maximilian: The Visual Ideology of a Holy Roman Emperor. Princeton, NJ: Princeton University Press, 2022
