= St. Anthony's Hospital =

St. Anthony's Hospital may refer to:

- St. Anthony's Hospital (Columbus, Ohio), formerly in Columbus, Ohio
- Saint Anthony's Hospital (Morrilton, Arkansas), listed on the NRHP in Arkansas
- St. Anthony's Hospital Annex, Las Vegas, New Mexico, listed on the NRHP in New Mexico
- St. Anthony's Hospital (St. Petersburg, Florida)
- St Anthony's Hospital, North Cheam, London Borough of Sutton
- St. Anthony's Hospital, St Benet Fink, a mediaeval hospital in the City of London

== See also ==
- St. Anthony Hospital (disambiguation)
- St. Anthony's Hospital Heliport
- St. Anthony's Hospital fire
