= Order of Saint Anthony (Ethiopia) =

Ethiopian order of knighthood

- Type: Order
- Country: Ethiopian Empire
- Religious affiliation: Ethiopian Orthodox
- Emperor of Ethiopia
- Grades: Knight Grand Cross (KGCA); Companion (CA)
- Ribbon of the order

The Order of Saint Anthony was a possibly apocryphal chivalric order of Ethiopia, which according to legend was founded around 370 by the Emperor of Ethiopia. It was bestowed exclusively on clerics. Pedro Páez in his History of Ethiopia seems to write that, in his travels throughout the country, there was no person familiar with any such Order and that it was an invented fable.

Mentioned more in Western sources than Ethiopian ones, it is speculated that it might have originally been a monastic order following Saint Anthony the Great, rather than a European-style chivalric order, but was perceived as such by medieval Western as the latter, who in turn re-imported their misconception into Ethiopia in the late Middle Ages, where it was adopted and purportedly awarded by both the Emperor and the Abuna of the Tewahedo Church.

There are several references to the order in European texts in the Early modern period, some deeming it fraudulent and others recognising it as a powerful monastic order with thousands of members and a chapter house "in every town" of the country, a very unusual occurrence in a period where what little Westerners "knew" about Ethiopia, such as its "ruler" Prester John, was generally wildly inaccurate. Several works on Ethiopia during this period mentioned the order; Samuel Purchas in his 1613 Purchas, His Pilgrimage wrote of the "monastical knights of the military order of Saint Anthony". In 1632, one Balthasar Giron, who purported he was "an Abyssinian", in Rome claimed he possessed the "ancient order" of "St. Anthony of Ethiopia", until he was exposed as a fraud by the Maronite scholar Abraham Echelensis. It is not clear whether the Order was also dismissed as fraudulent or merely Giron's claim of membership.

There does not appear to be any mention of the order until it was notionally revived by the Ethiopian monarchy-in-exile after 1987, and is today awarded by the Crown Council of Ethiopia. It is an award given mostly to clerics and to academics of distinction. The Order today has two different grades, that of the Knight Grand Cross (KGCA), and that of the Companion (CA).

== See also ==
- Order of Saint Anthony (Bavaria)
