= Brays, Missouri =

Unincorporated community in Missouri, USA

Coordinates: 38°07′13″N 92°14′41″W

Brays is an unincorporated community in eastern Miller County, in the U.S. state of Missouri. The community is adjacent to Missouri Route 42 on the east side of the Tavern Creek floodplain, approximately three miles northeast of Iberia.

== History ==
A post office called Brays was established in 1894, and remained in operation until 1923. The community has the name of Tom Bray, the proprietor of a local mill.
