= Santo Antônio de Lisboa (disambiguation) =

Santo Antônio de Lisboa or Santo António de Lisboa (English: Saint Anthony of Lisbon) generally refers to Anthony of Padua, also known as Saint Anthony of Lisbon (Portuguese: Santo Antônio de Lisboa or Santo António de Lisboa)

Santo Antônio de Lisboa may also refer to:

- Santo Antônio de Lisboa, Piauí, a municipality in the state of Piauí, Brazil
- Santo Antônio de Lisboa, Santa Catarina - a district in the city of Florianópolis, Santa Catarina, Brazil

== See also ==
- Santo Antônio (disambiguation)
