= St. Anthony Hospital (Pendleton, Oregon) =

- Catholic Health Initiatives

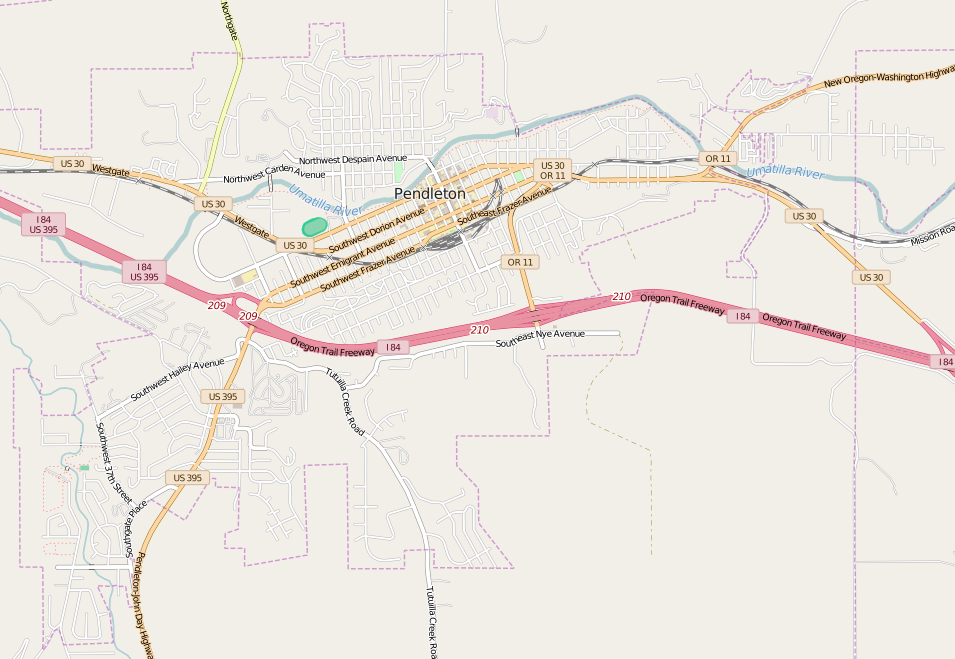
- Location in Pendleton, Oregon

Geography
- Location: Pendleton, Umatilla County, Oregon, United States
- Coordinates: 45.6488°N 118.8123°W

Organization
- Care system: Medicare/Medicaid/Charity/Public
- Type: General

Services
- Emergency department: Level IV trauma center
- Beds: 49 (licensed); 25 (available)

History
- Founded: 1902

Links
- Website: www.sahpendleton.org
- Lists: Hospitals in Oregon

St. Anthony Hospital is an acute care hospital in Pendleton in the U.S. state of Oregon. The 25-bed facility, licensed for 49 beds, is a level 4 trauma center. Opened in 1902, it is part of the Catholic Health Initiatives and is accredited by the Joint Commission. The new campus sits along U.S. Route 395 on the south side of the city.

== History ==
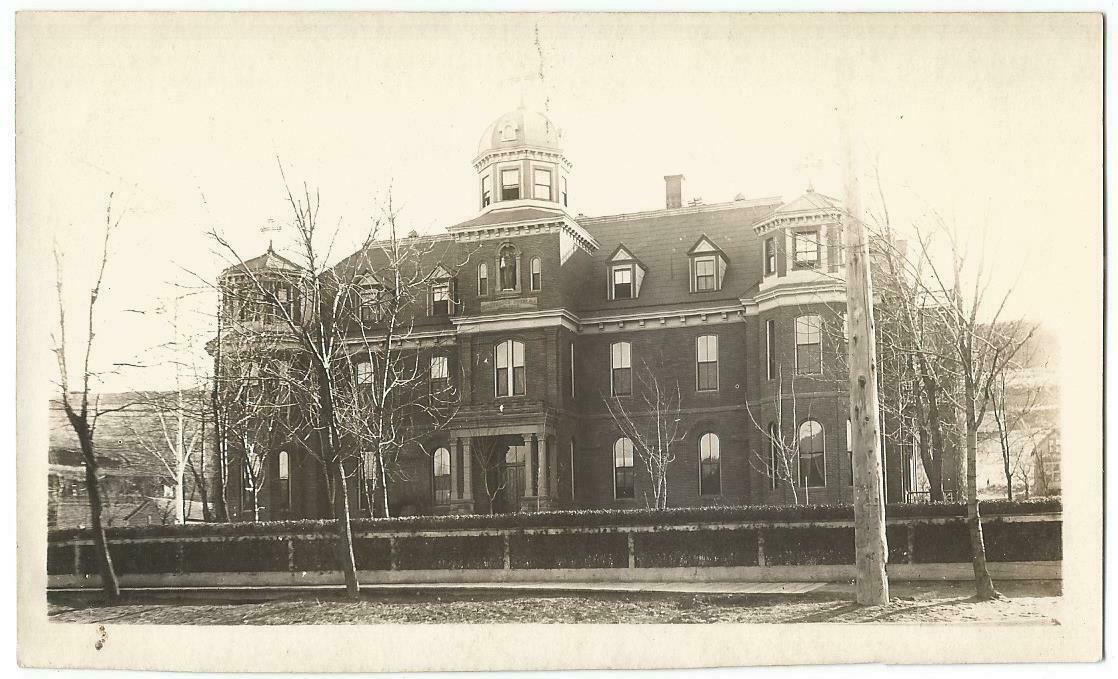
Original hospital building c. 1920

The Sisters of St. Francis of Assisi, based in Philadelphia, began fundraising for a hospital in Pendleton in 1901, and the next year the three-story, 40-bed hospital opened at a cost of $75,000. As part of the fundraising, one of the nuns placed donation cans in saloons in the city, which raised $8,000. St. Anthony's added a nursing school in 1909, which later closed in 1955. The hospital expanded to 75 beds in 1922 after a $200,000 addition.

The hospital spent $2.1 million in 1961 to remodel the hospital, which included demolishing the first hospital building in 1962. A $17 million upgrade started in 2002 that included a new addition and $6 million in new imaging equipment. In May 2004, the hospital was listed as a critical access hospital by the state.

The city's planning commission approved a new hospital campus on 93 acres (38 ha) on the south side of the city along U.S. Route 395 in February 2012. Construction began in May 2012 on what was planned to be a $70 million, 103,000-square-foot (9,600 m^{2}) project that included an office building and helipad. Originally the hospital was to open on November 20, 2013, but the Oregon Health Authority had not issued a license for the hospital, so the opening was delayed until December 20 after a license was granted on November 26. The new $70 million, 102,000-square-foot (9,500 m^{2}) hospital was two stories tall.

== Details ==
The hospital is licensed for 49 beds, but as of 2013 only had 25 beds available. Services at the hospital include emergency services, a maternity ward, imaging, hospice, an intensive care unit, a sleep disorders laboratory, operating rooms, cancer care, and cardiac services, among others. The 102,000-square-foot (9,500 m^{2}), two-storey hospital sits on a 93-acre (38 ha) campus along U.S. Route 395. The campus also has a medical office building and a helipad.

The state of Oregon classifies the hospital as a Type A Rural hospital and as a critical access facility. It is also a level four trauma center, and accredited by the Joint Commission. St. Anthony is part of the Catholic Health Initiatives hospital network.

For 2012, the hospital had a total of 1,471 discharges, with 4,374 patient days, and 11,531 emergency room visits. Also that year were 341 births and 680 inpatient surgeries. For the fiscal year ending in 2011, the hospital had total revenues of $54.4 million and a profit of $7.9 million. That year St. Anthony Hospital also provided $4.7 million in charity care.
