= Order of Saint Anthony (Bavaria) =

The Order of Saint Anthony was a Bavarian military order founded in 1382 by Duke Albert of Bavaria.

== History ==
The Order of Saint Anthony was created in 1382, after Duke Albert had pledged to go to war with the Ottoman Empire.

== Uniform ==
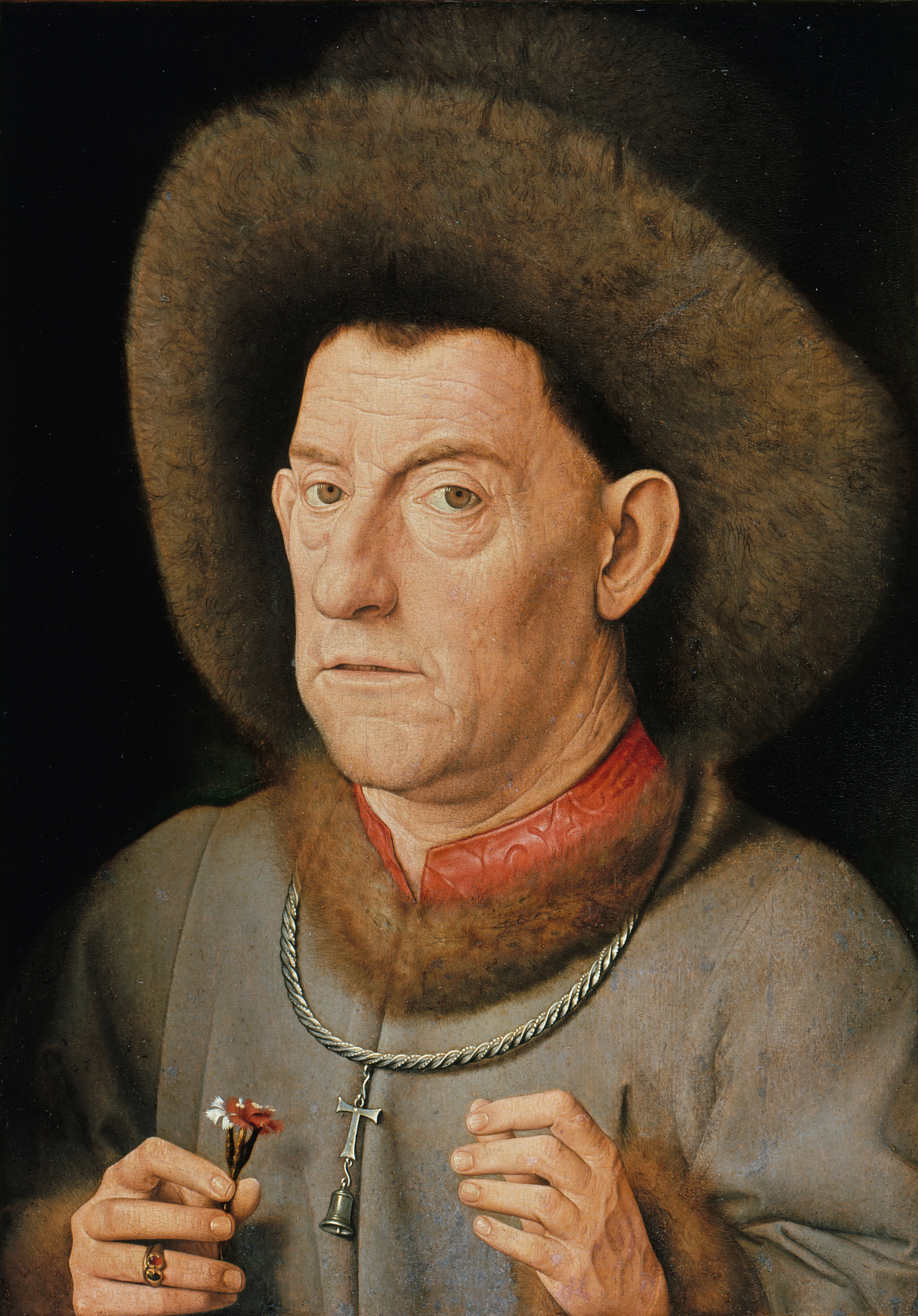
15th-century portrait of a man wearing the medal of the Order of Saint Anthony

The knights of Order of Saint Anthony wore a gold collar, from which hung a tau cross and a little bell.

== See also ==
- Order of Saint Anthony (Ethiopia)
