= Virgin and Child of Poligny =

Virgin and the Child of Poligny
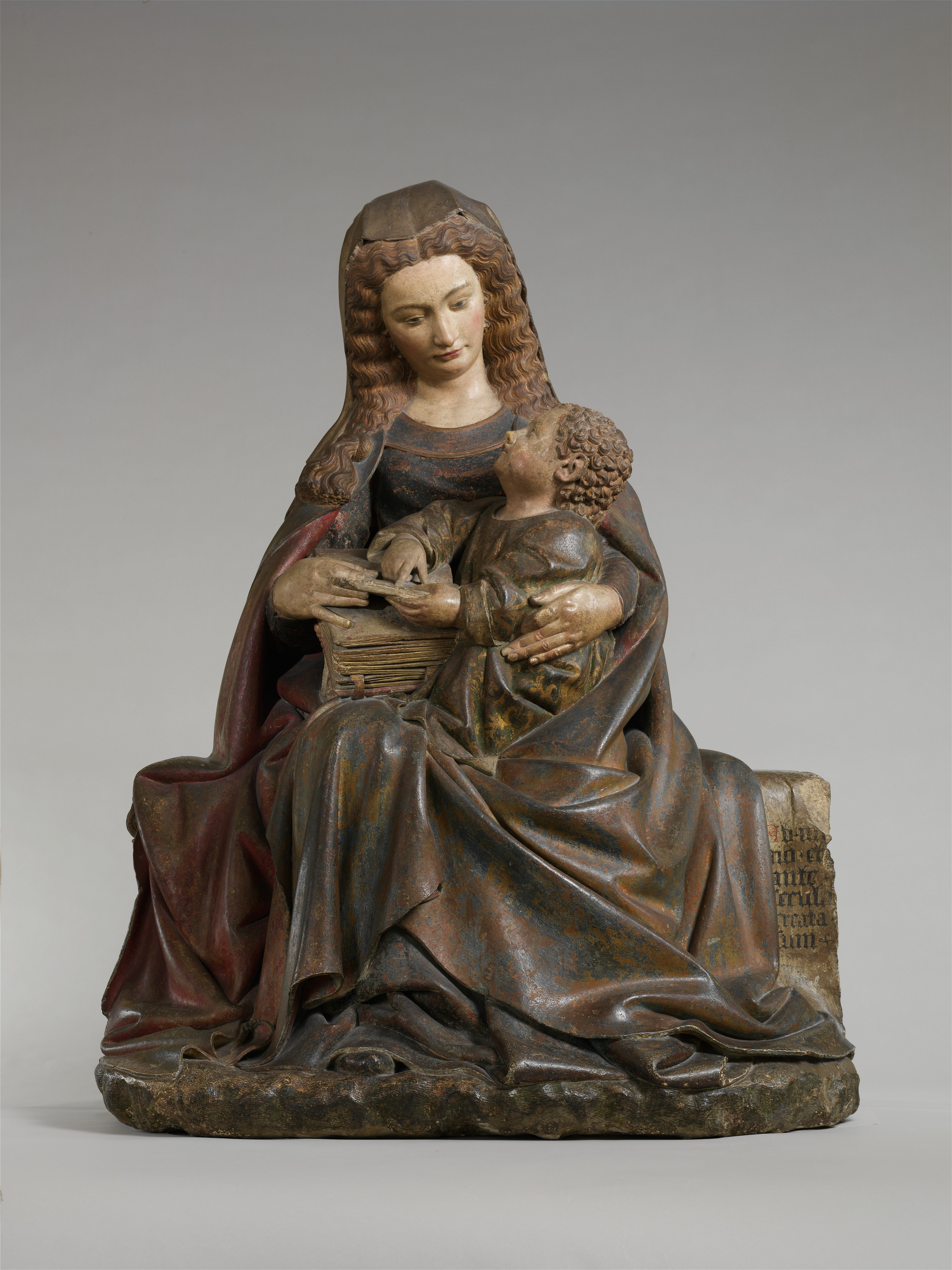
- Artist: Attributed to Claus de Werve
- Year: c. 1415–17
- Medium: painted limestone, gilding
- Dimensions: Height: 135.5 cm (53.3 in); Width: 104.5 cm (41.1 in)
- Location: Metropolitan Museum of Art; New York
- Accession: Rogers fund, 33.23

The Virgin and Child of Poligny is a large statue attributed to the Burgundian court sculpturer Claus de Werve, with some of the painted sections perhaps assisted by Henri Bellechose. It was created c. 1415–17 for the convent of Poor Clares order in Poligny, France, having been commissioned by one of the convents founders; John the Fearless, Duke of Burgundy or his wife Margaret of Bavaria.

The work is made from polychromed (painted) limestone and gilding. It depicts the Christ Child sitting on a large book placed on his mother's lap. The statue is described as one of de Werve's masterpieces, and has been in the collection of Metropolitan Museum of Art, New York, since 1933.

The Virgin and Child of Poligny was cleaned and exhibited in Paris around 1920 by the art dealer Georges Demotte, who later sold it to Jacques Seligmann, who in turn passed it to the Metropolitan.

== Description ==
At a height of 135.5 cm (53.3 in), the Virgin and Child of Poligny is larger than life-size, giving it the monumental feel characteristic of Burgundian sculpture first established by de Werve's uncle Claus Sluter (d. 1405 or 1406), under whom the artist served his apprenticeship. Apart from the quality of its workmanship and composition, the work is especially notable because the normally highly perishable polychrome survives. This provides rare insight into how it would have appeared in use in the convent.

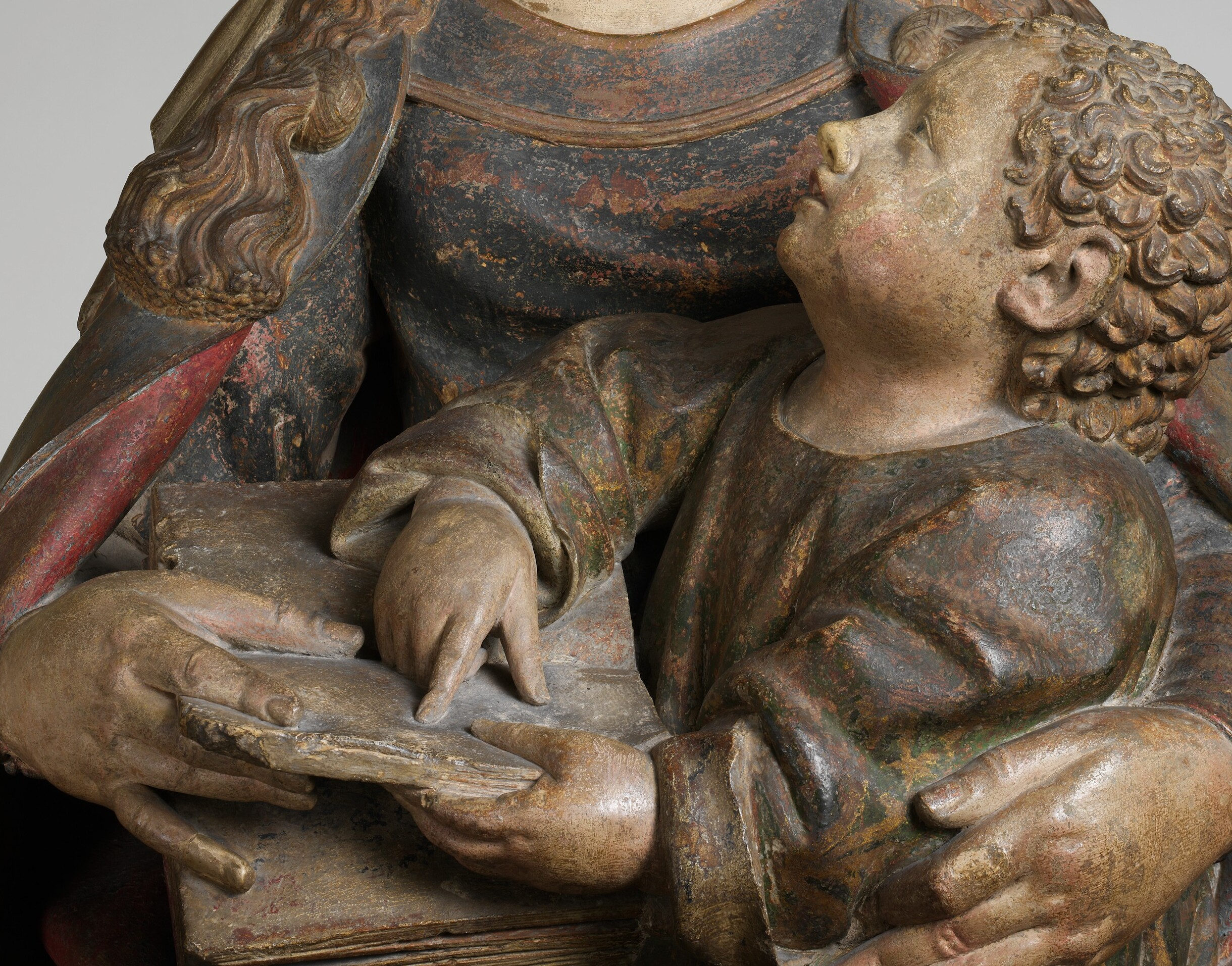
Detail showing the Christ Child pointing at the book held in their hands.

The Virgin Mary is positioned slightly off centre, seated on a long cushioned bench. She wears a white veil over her long and wavy hair which was originally gilted. Her long cloak is mainly in blue, with some sections painted red. The cloak falls from her, creating zig-zag patterns of descending folds. The cloak has a line of small buttons fastening its close-fitting sleeves.

The Virgin cradles the Christ Child in her arms, as he rests on a large book or manuscript placed on her lap. Christ has thick and curly hair and is dressed in a green garment decorated with a painted gold griffin and a series of dark-greenish foliage. The griffin takes the form of a combined eagle and lion, representing strength and courage respectively, and may have been added by the painter Henri Bellechose (d. 1445), who may also have added some of the brocade designs.

Christ is smiling as he looks up at Mary, while their heads lean in opposite directions. Both are holding a small book with parchment leaves. Mary looks down at a passage on an open page in the book, which Christ points at with his right hand. His mouth is open, indicating that he is speaking to her, perhaps about what he has been reading in the passage he is pointing towards.

The Latin inscriptions on the right-hand front and side of the bench are set within scrolls. The text is from the Book of Ecclesiasticus and reads in part "INI I TIO ET I ANTE / SECULA I CREATA I/ SUM" (from the beginning, and before the world, was I created.)

The work is in excellent condition. Although it was repainted a number of times, restorers have been able to remove the overpaint to return the original colours, which however have darkened over the centuries.

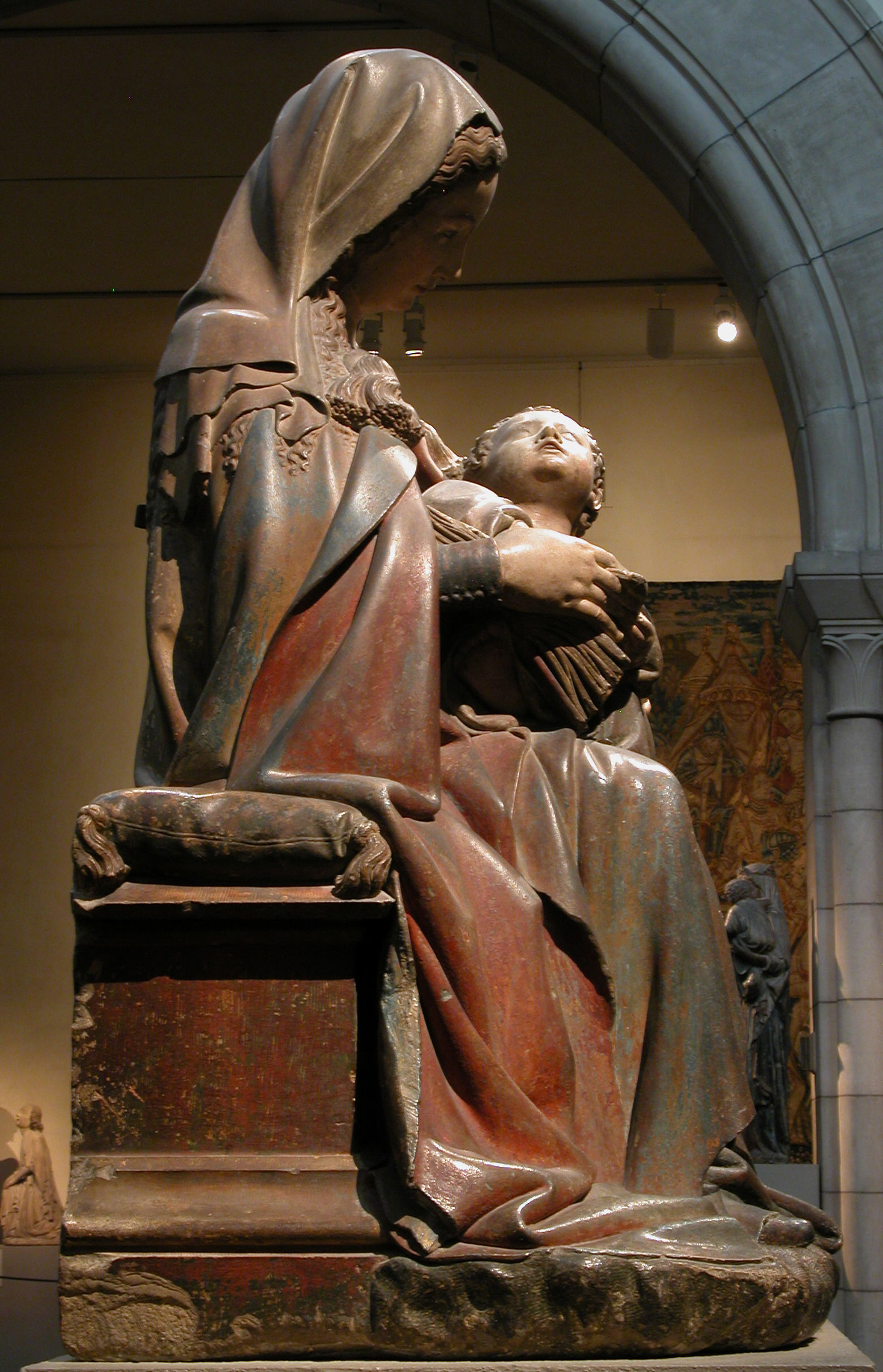
Left-hand View

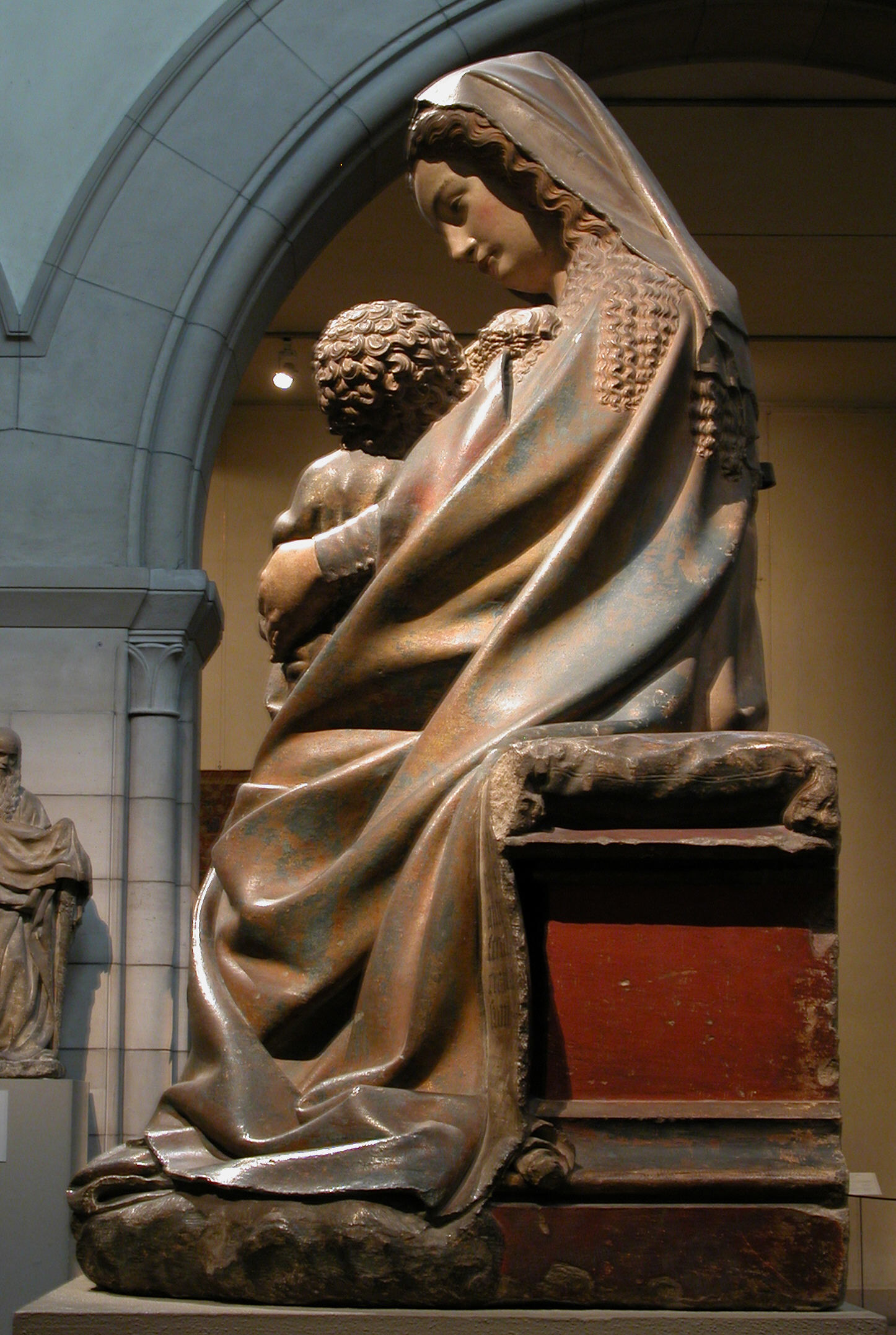
Right-hand View

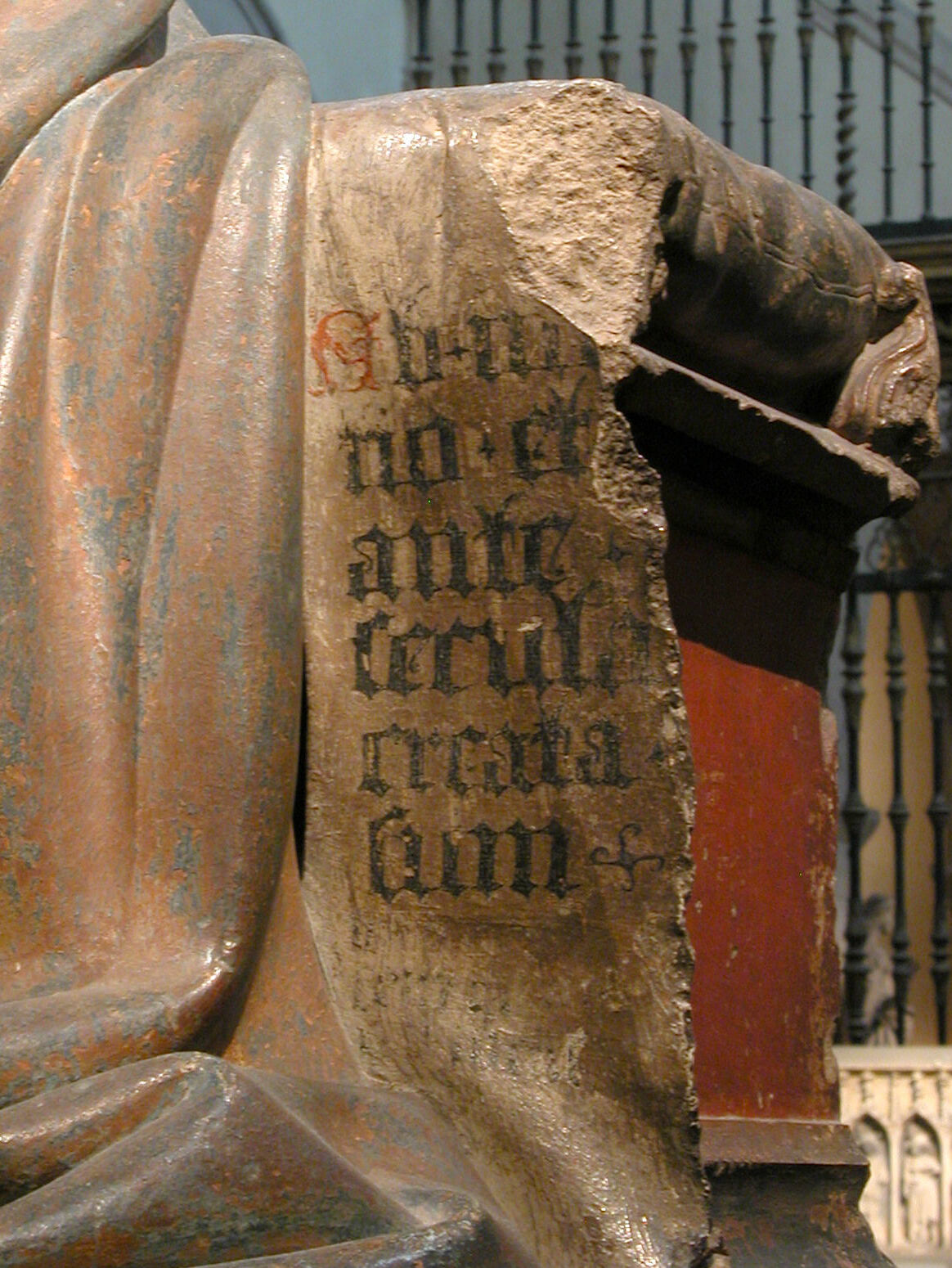
Inscription on the side of the bench

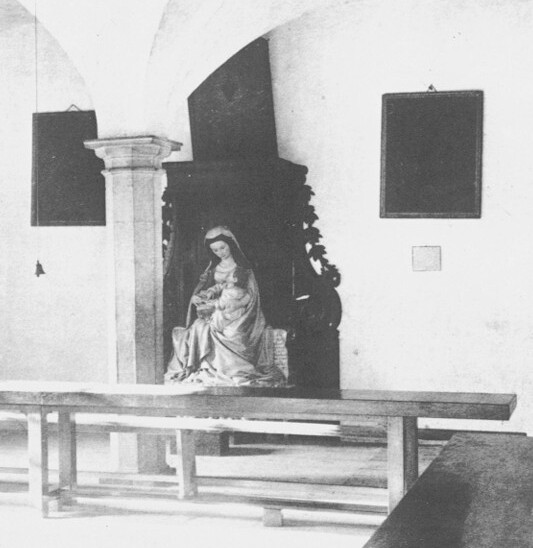
Photograph of "The Virgin and Child" while in Poligny. George Demotte, c. 1920

== Sources ==
- Breck, Joseph. "A Late Gothic Sculpture." The Metropolitan Museum of Art, bulletin 28, no. 4, April 1933. pp. 74–76. JSTOR 3255019
- de Winter, Patrick. "Art from the Duchy of Burgundy". The Bulletin of the Cleveland Museum of Art, volume 74, number 10, 1987. pp. 406-449. JSTOR 25160010
- Forsyth, William. "A Fifteenth-Century Virgin and Child Attributed to Claux de Werve". New York: Metropolitan Museum Journal, volume 21, 1986. pp. 41–63. JSTOR 1512824
- Frish, Teresa Grace. Gothic Art 1140 –c. 1450: Sources and Documents. Toronto: University of Toronto Press, 1987.
