= Claus de Werve =

French sculptor

- Born: c. 1380; Haarlem
- Died: 1439; Dijon
- Other name: Claux de Werve
- Occupation: sculptor

Claus or Claux de Werve (c. 1380–1439) was a sculptor active at the Burgundian court under Philip the Bold between 1395 and 1439. He was probably born in the Dutch city of Haarlem around 1380.

In 1396 he became the assistant to his uncle, Claus Sluter at the Burgundian court in Dijon, France. He helped his uncle carve the mourners on the tomb of Philip the Bold. Upon Sluter's death in 1406 he took over the position of Chief Sculptor at the court. As chief sculptor he produced a number of masterpieces, including the Virgin and Child of Poligny, now at the Metropolitan Museum in New York.

== Career ==
Claus de Werve served at uncle Claus Sluter's workshop in Dijon as a sixteen-year-old sculptor's apprentice. There he worked on Sluter's most famous work, the Well of Moses. After Sluter's death in 1406, de Werve served Duke Jean the Good and his son Philip the Bold as "tailleur d'ymages et varlet de chambre".

Between 1406 and 1410, he assisted with the completion of the tomb of Philip the Bold in Champmol (now the Musée Archéologique, Dijon), on which the sculptors Jean de Marville and Sluter had earlier worked.

He is considered the author of the alabaster figures of Mourners of Dijon. Their conception is characterised by the individualisation of the monks and the expressive rendering of their draperies.

De Werve travelled to Savoy in 1408 at the invitation of Duke Amadeus VIII and probably worked at Sainte-Chapelle in Chambéry. He lived in Paris between 1400 and 141. Claus de Werve died in 1439 and was succeeded as court sculptor by Jean de la Huerta (d. 1462).

== Selected works ==
=== Attributed ===
- The Well of Moses (1396-1405), collaboration with Claus Sluter. De Werve particularly sculpted the weeping angels.
- The Tomb of Philip the Bold (1406-1410), begun by Jean de Marville and Claus Sluter and completed by de Werve, who sculpted the angels and almost all of the mourners
- Virgin and Child of Poligny, c. 1415–17, Metropolitan Museum of Art, New York

=== Workshop or followers ===
- Saint Paul, c. 1420–30, Metropolitan Museum of Art

== Gallery ==
=== Attributed ===
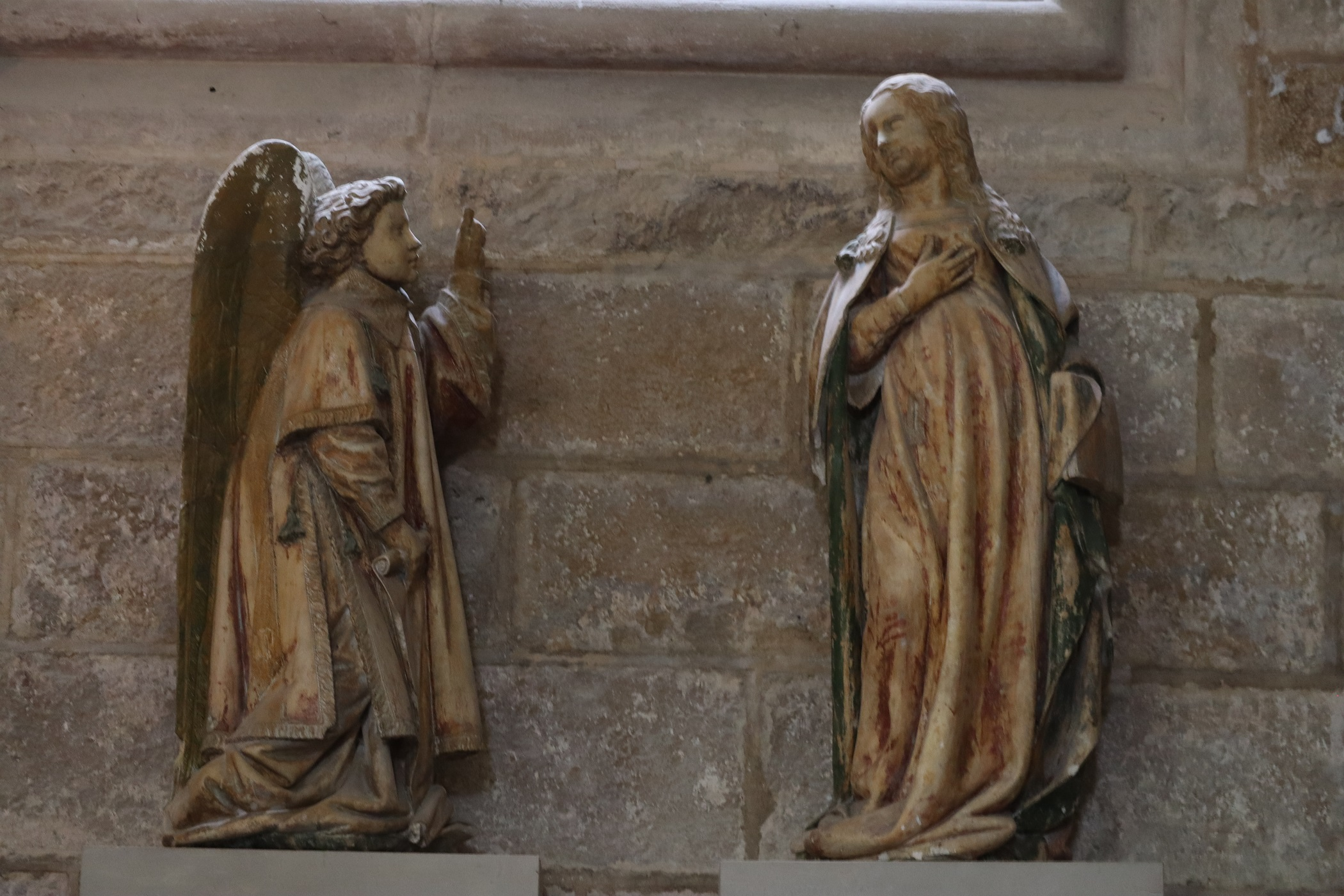
Annunciation, Saint-Seine-l'Abbaye, France

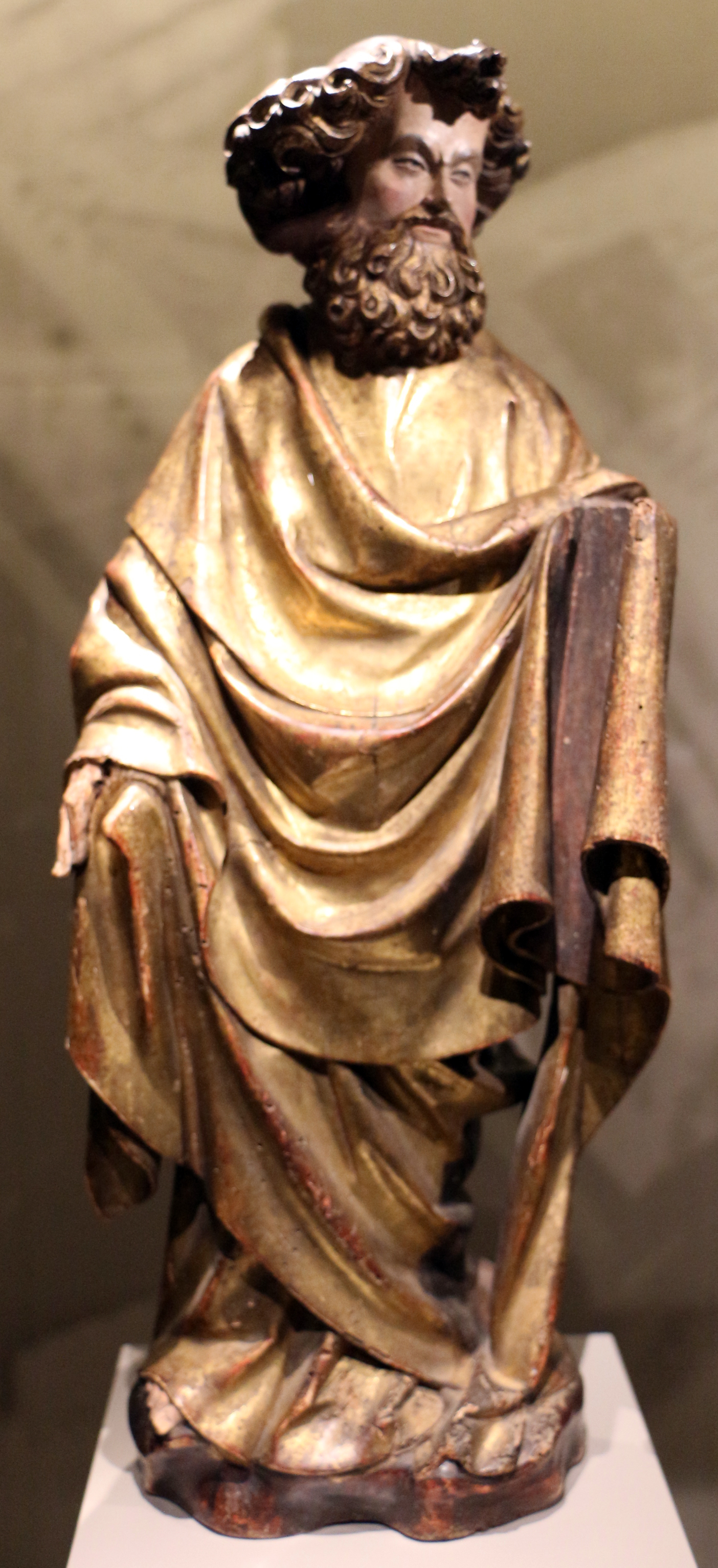
Saint Peter, c. 1410-20, Museum Catharijneconvent, Utrecht, Netherlands

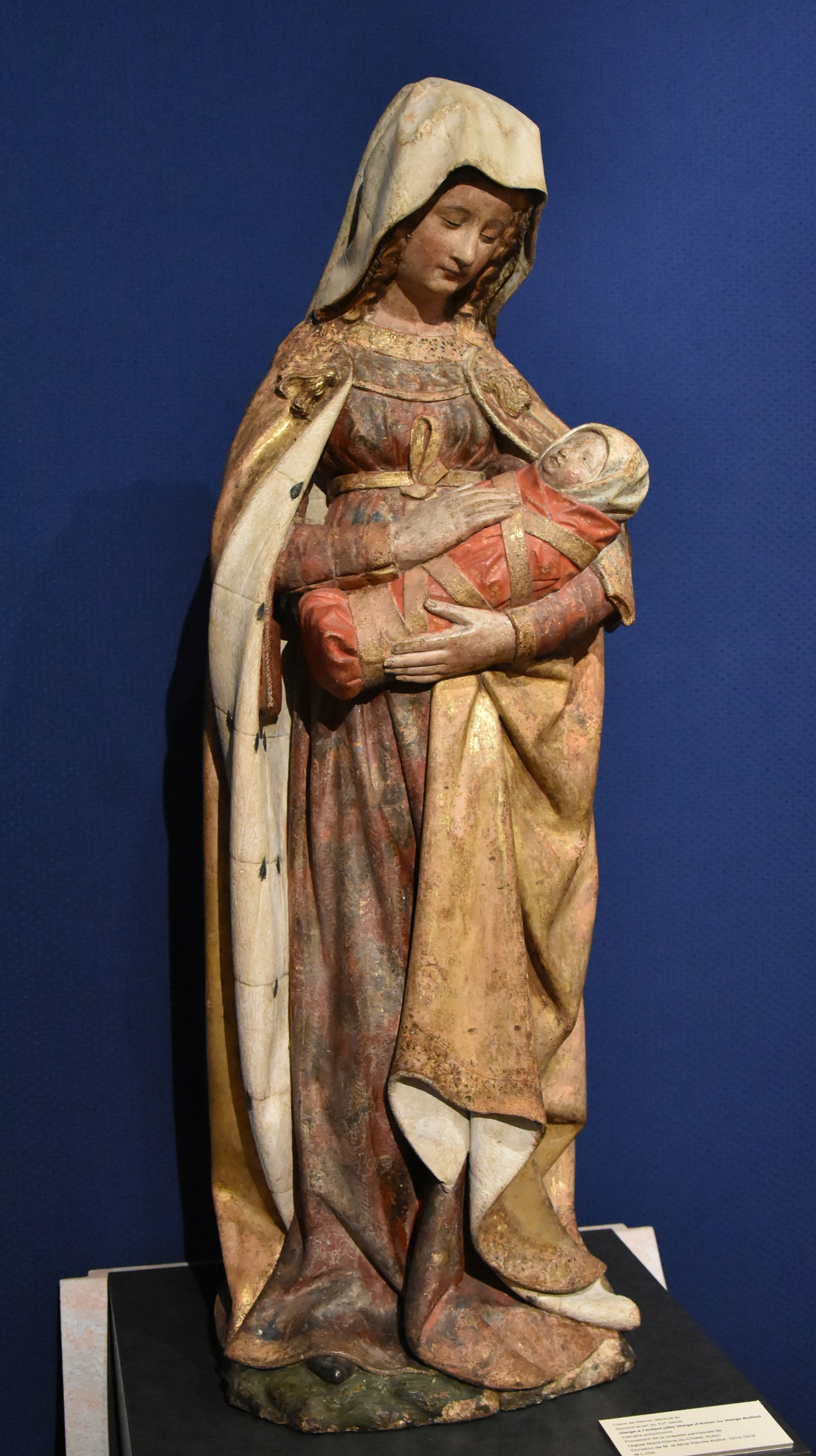
Virgin and Child, Musée Rolin, Burgundy, France.

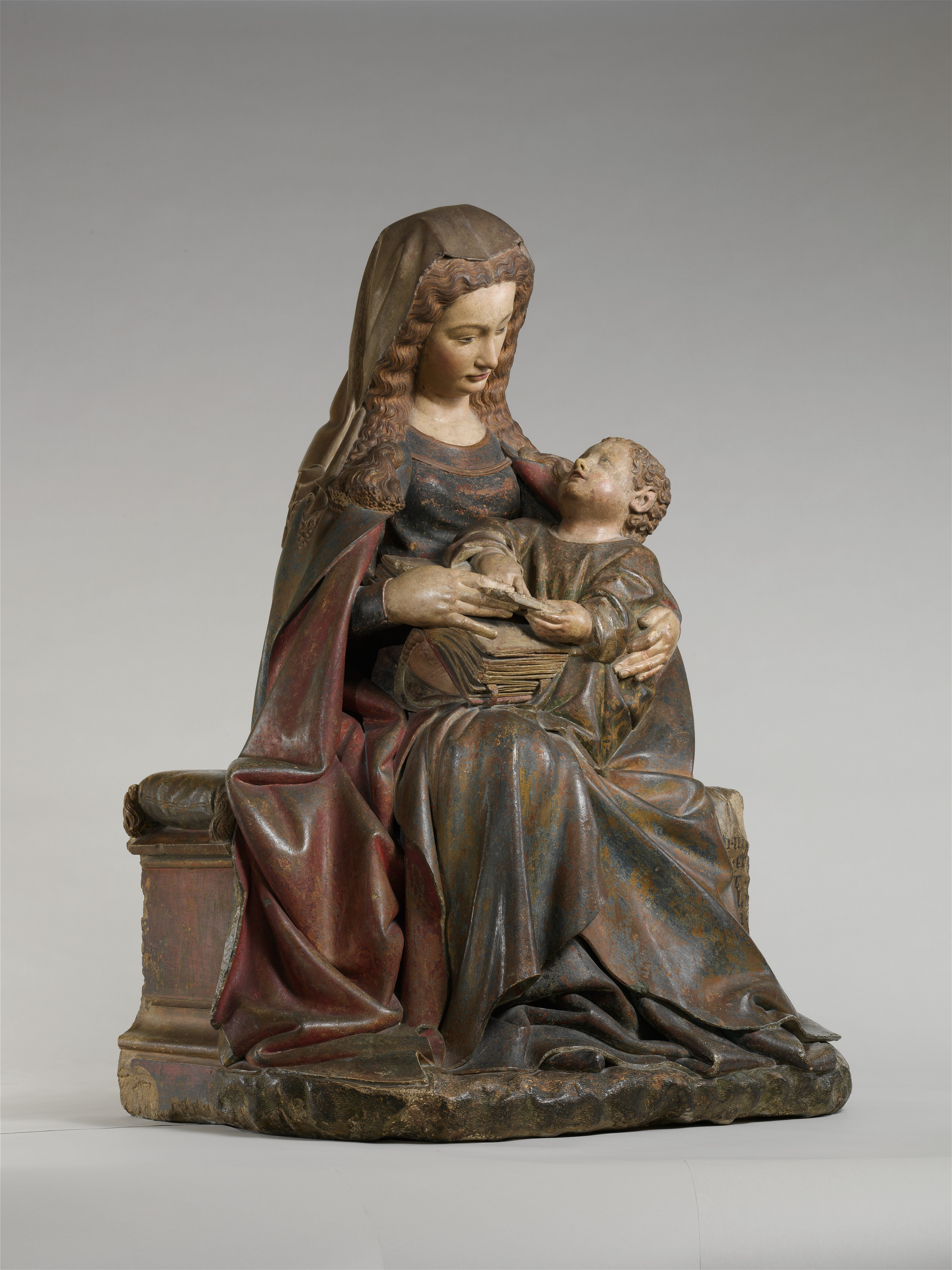
Virgin and Child of Poligny, c. 1415–17, Metropolitan Museum, NYC

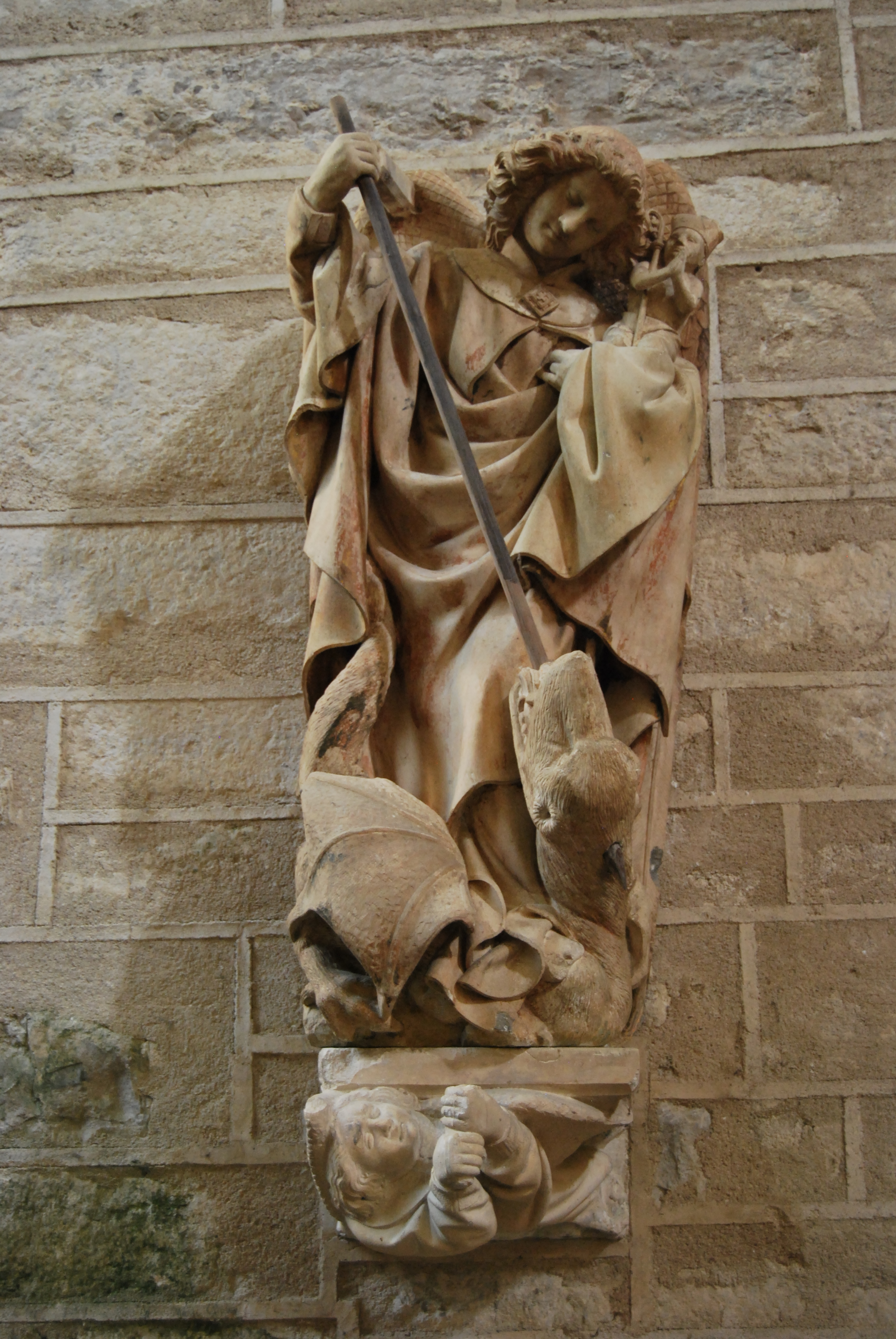
Saint Michel, from the funerary monument of Amé de Chalon, abbot of Baume-les-Messieurs

=== Workshop or followers ===
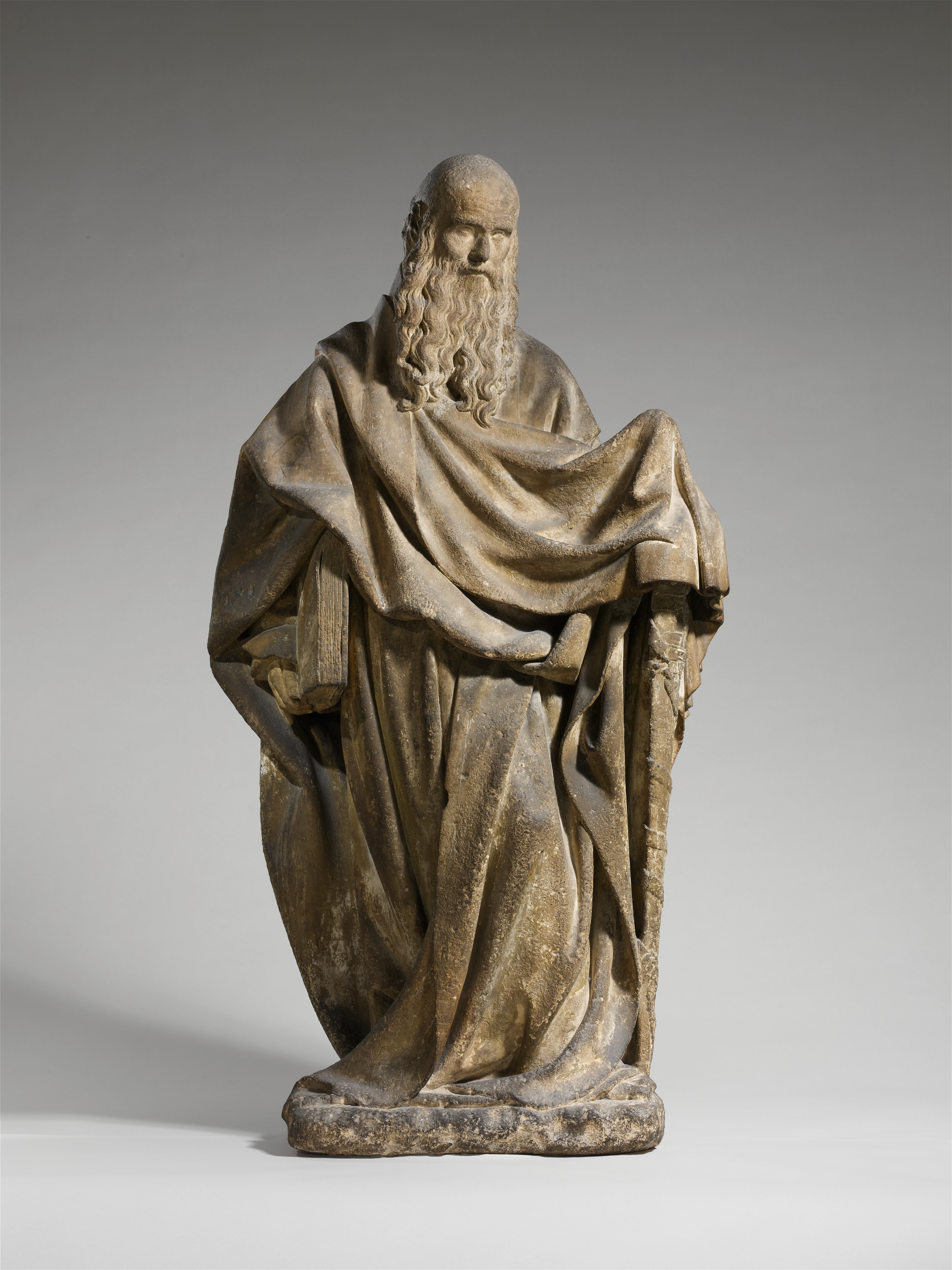
Saint Paul, c. 1420–30, Metropolitan Museum of Art

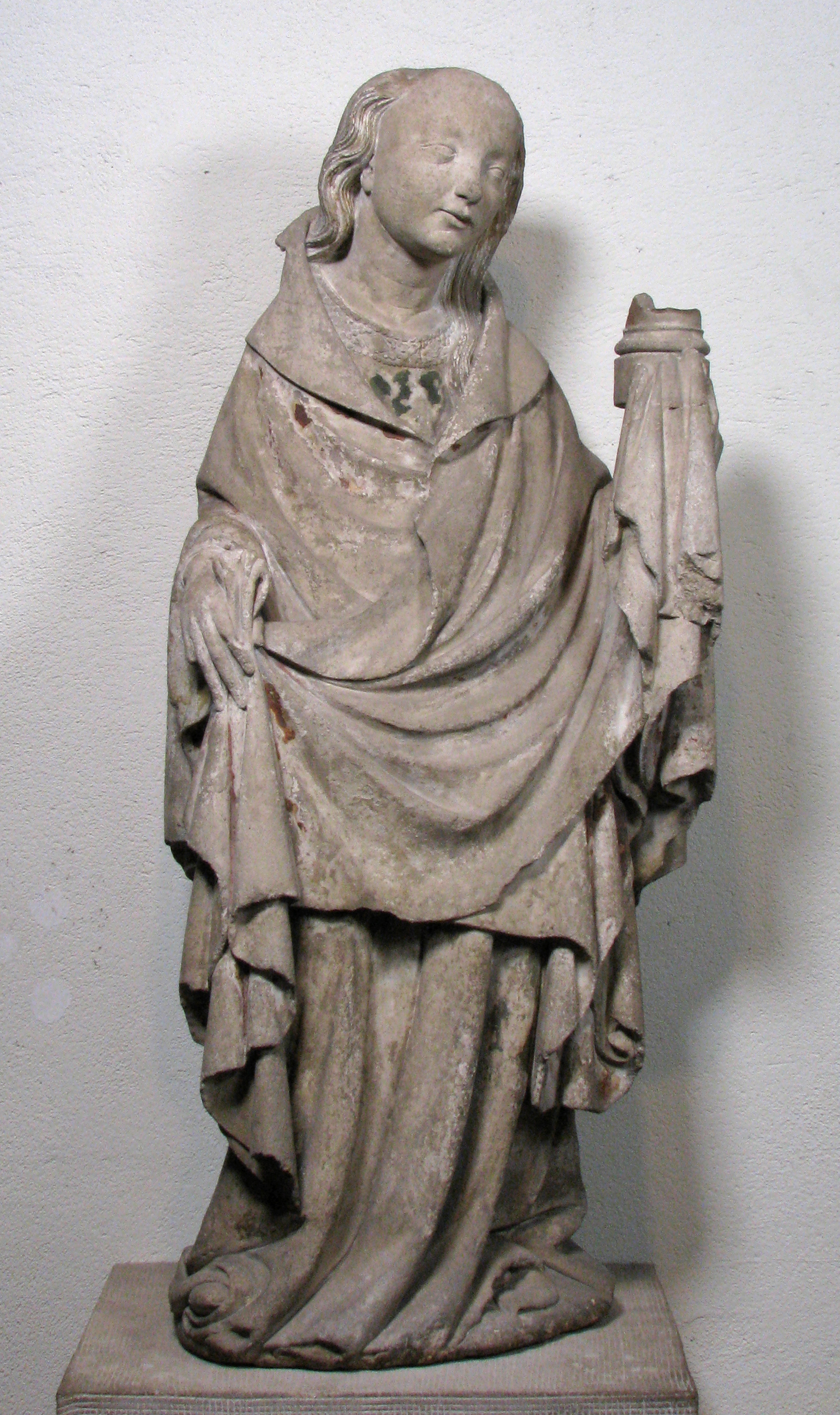
Saint Barbara, mid-15th century, Metropolitan Museum of Art

== Sources ==
- Antoine, Elisabeth. Art from the Court of Burgundy: The Patronage of Philip the Bold and John the Fearless, 1364-1419. Seattle (WA): University of Washington, 2005. ISBN 978-2-7118-4864-5
- de Winter, Patrick. "Art from the Duchy of Burgundy". The Bulletin of the Cleveland Museum of Art, volume 74, number 10, 1987. pp. 406-449. JSTOR 25160010
- Forsyth, William. "A Fifteenth-Century Virgin and Child Attributed to Claux de Werve". New York: Metropolitan Museum Journal, volume 21, 1986. pp. 41–63. JSTOR 1512824
- Frish, Teresa Grace. Gothic Art 1140 –c. 1450: Sources and Documents. Toronto: University of Toronto Press, 1987.
- Nash, Susie. Northern Renaissance art. Oxford: Oxford University Press, 2008. ISBN 0-19-284269-2
- Nash, Susie. "Claus Sluter's 'Well of Moses' for the Chartreuse de Champmol Reconsidered: Part I". The Burlington Magazine, Dec 2005. Volume 147, issue 1233
