= Henri Bellechose =

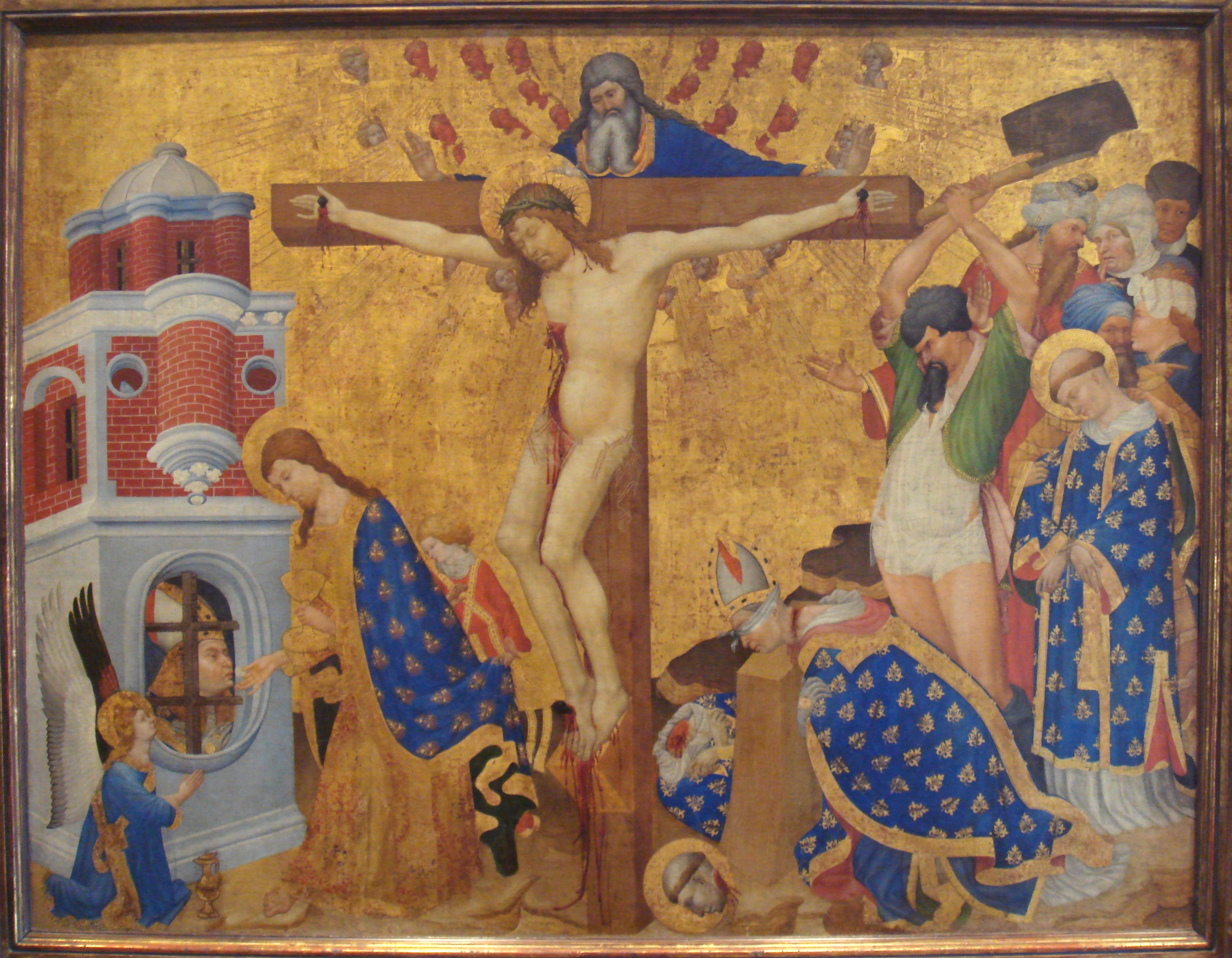
The Last Communion and Martyrdom of Saint Denis, by Henri Bellechose, 1416

Henri Bellechose (fl. 1415; died before 28 January 1445) was a painter from the South Netherlands. He was one of the most significant artists at the beginning of panel painting in Northern Europe, and among the earliest artists of Early Netherlandish painting.

== Early life ==
Bellechose was an artist who came from the South Netherlands to Dijon to work for the Dukes of Burgundy. There he was appointed court painter to John the Fearless, Duke of Burgundy and "valet de chambre", a court appointment, as his predecessor Jean Malouel and successor Jan van Eyck were. Nothing is known of his career before this, and it has been suggested that he had been working as Malouel's assistant for some time, and for some art historians their oeuvres are closely entangled.

== Career ==
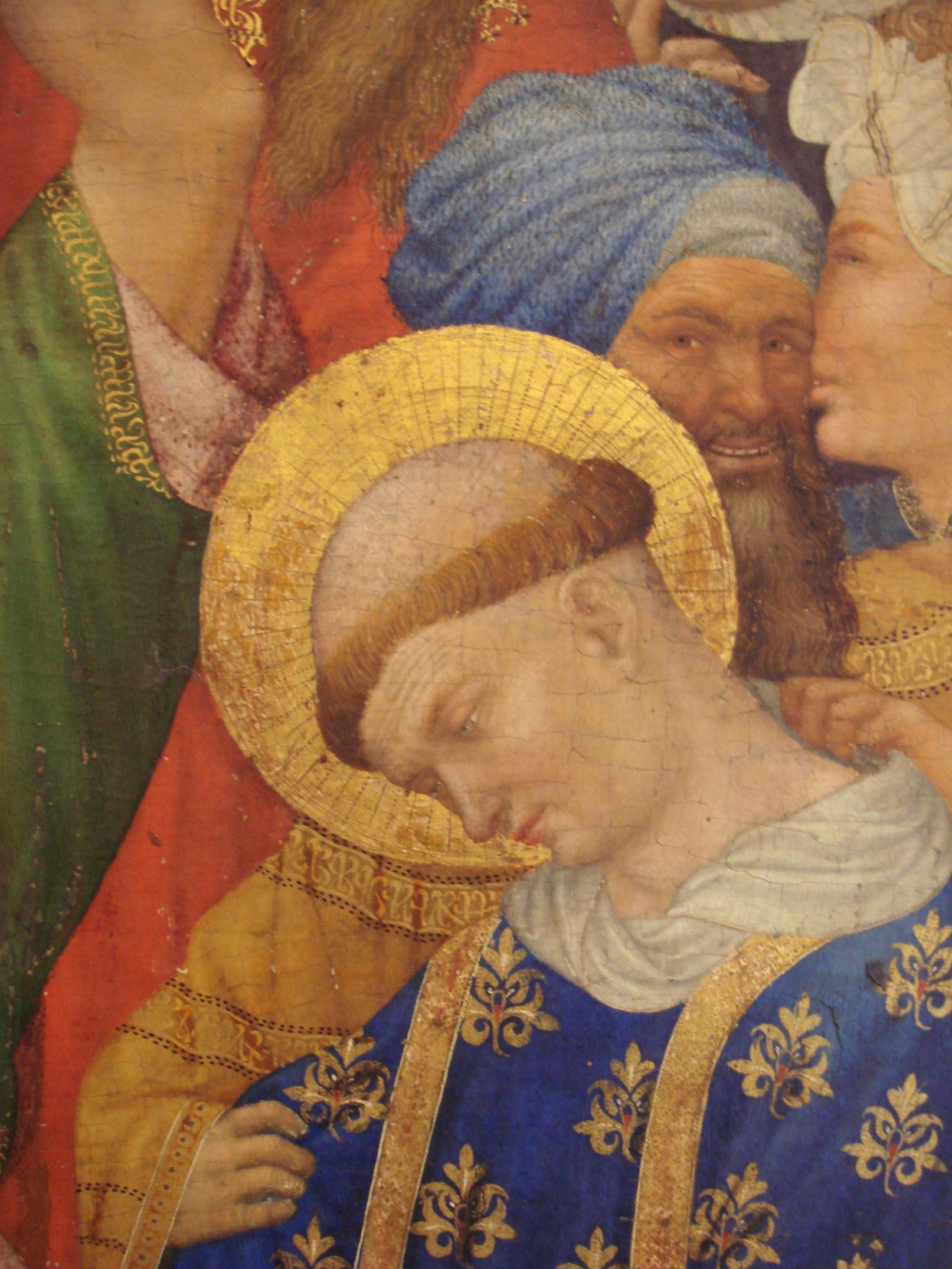
Detail. Pseudo-Kufic inscriptions are visible on the garments of the Gaulish pagan priests, shown in exotic Middle Eastern costume.

Almost all of Bellechose's documented work was commissions from the Dukes of Burgundy, with some works for churches in Dijon. However the number of works recorded in the meticulous Burgundian accounts greatly exceed the number that survive; and only two may possibly fall into both categories.

His famous Martyrdom of Saint Denis in the Louvre, like other panel paintings by him, was commissioned by the Duke for the Chartreuse of Champmol in Dijon, founded by Philip the Bold as a dynastic burial place. The pigments to "parfaire" (literally "perfect" - a word much argued over) an image of the "Life of St Denis", but not any gold for the gold ground, were advanced by the Duchy in May 1415. This has led to the suggestion that the work was left incomplete by Malouel, who had been given wood for five altarpieces as early as 1398. According to this theory, Bellechose simply completed a work with underdrawing and a gold background already in place. James Snyder and Chátelet support Malouel's participation, but this is disputed, especially in an article of 1961 by Nicole Reynaud (in French). For Chátelet this and the Louvre large tondo usually attributed to Malouel are two of the five altarpieces commissioned in 1398; however he suggests the tondo is by Bellechose when he was Malouel's assistant, thus reversing the traditional attributions of these works. - against Malouel's involvement are the Concise Grove, and it is not mentioned on the Louvre website. Chátelet, 16-18 discusses the issues most fully. He feels the St Denis painting would have been painted from the top of the image downwards, so the upper portions are by Malouel.

In April 1420, when John the Fearless died, Bellechose was retained by his successor, Philip the Good. The works recorded in the accounts of the Duke were mostly decorative, including commissions such as coats of arms for funerals, as was normal for court artists, but two altarpieces, neither apparently surviving, were commissioned in 1425 and 1429. A court appointment by no means precluded outside work.

Bellechose had a large studio which at its peak consisted of eight assistants and two apprentices.

== Personal life ==
In about 1424 Bellechose married Alixant Lebon, the daughter of a notary.

In August 1429, he received his last ducal salary and his name disappears from the ducal accounts. Bellechose's salary had been decreased by two thirds since 1426. Philip the Good spent more time in the Netherlands where he employed the prodigious Jan van Eyck. We know that Bellechose was still alive in 1440, but absent from Dijon; by January 1445 he had died.
