= Tomb effigy =

Statue on top of a tomb

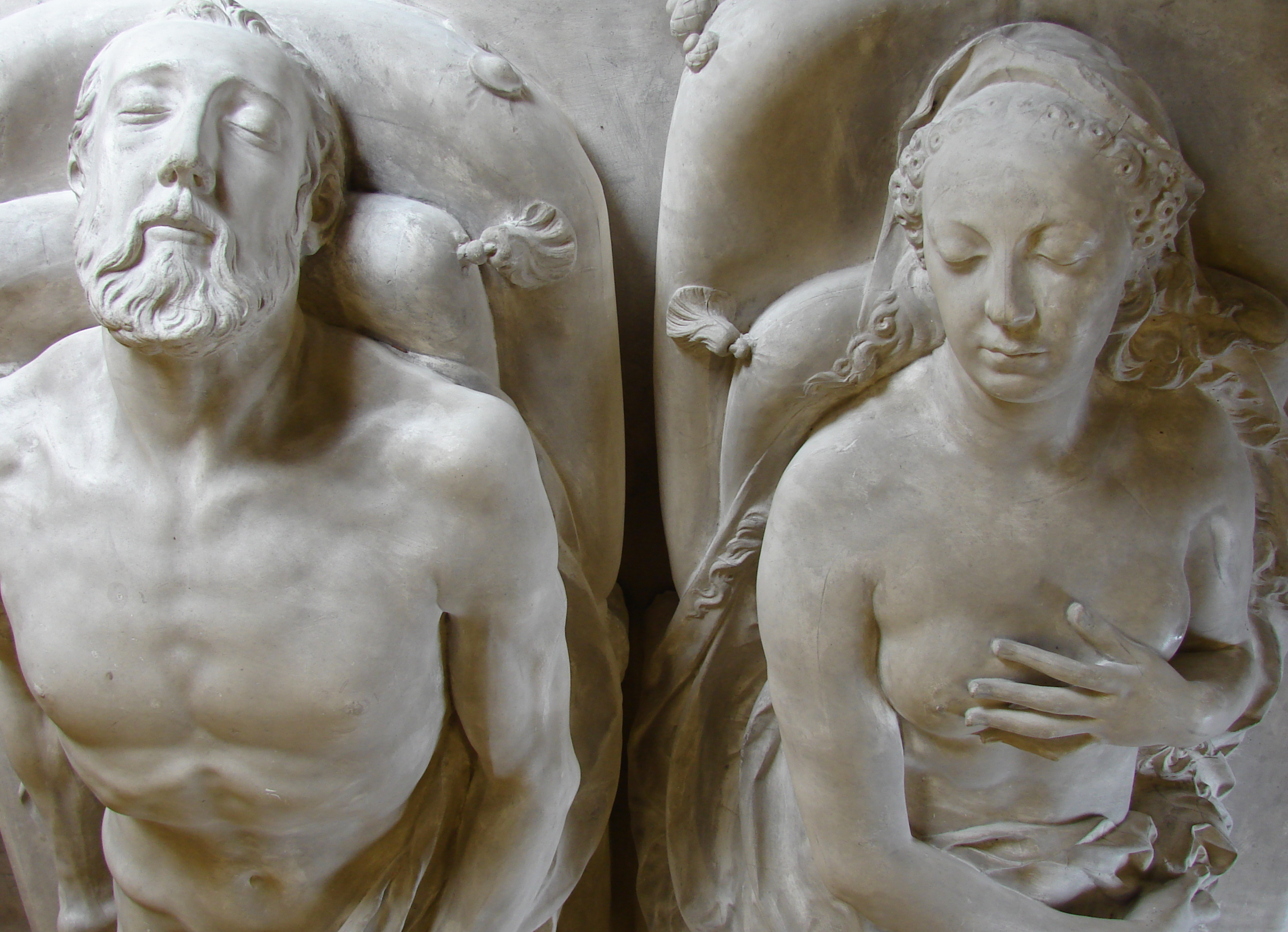
Effigies of Henry II of France and Catherine de' Medici. Germain Pilon, c. 1561–1573. Basilica of Saint-Denis, France.

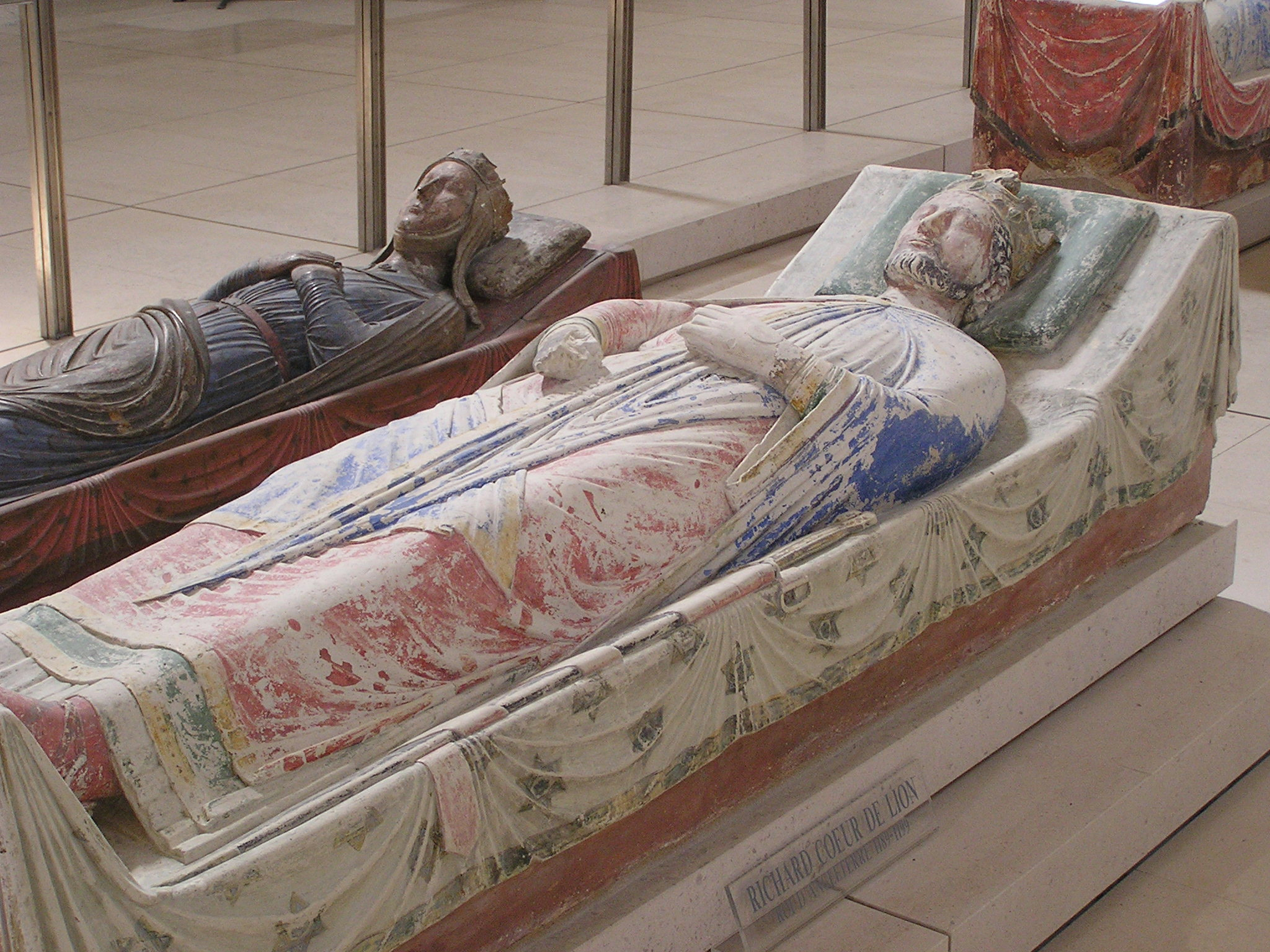
Double tomb of Richard I of England (Richard the Lionheart) and Isabella of Angoulême. Fontevraud Abbey, Anjou, France.

A tomb effigy (French: gisant ("lying")) is a sculpted effigy of a deceased person usually shown lying recumbent on a rectangular slab, presented in full ceremonial dress or wrapped in a shroud, and shown either dying or shortly after death. Such funerary and commemorative reliefs were first developed in Ancient Egyptian and Etruscan cultures, and appear most frequently in Western European tombs from the late 11th century, in a style that continued in use through the Renaissance and early modern period, and is still sometimes used. They typically represent the deceased in a state of "eternal repose", with hands folded in prayer, lying on a pillow, awaiting resurrection. A husband and wife may be depicted lying side by side.

Medieval life-size recumbent effigies were first used for tombs of royalty and senior clerics, before spreading to the nobility. A particular type of late medieval effigy was the transi, or cadaver monument, in which the effigy is in the macabre form of a decomposing corpse, or such a figure lies on a lower level, beneath a more conventional effigy. Mourning or weeping figures, known as pleurants were added to important tombs below the effigy. Non-recumbent types of effigy became popular during the Renaissance. By the early Modern period, European effigies were often shown as alive, either kneeling or in a more active pose, especially for military figures. Variations show the deceased lying on their side as if reading, kneeling in prayer, or even standing. The recumbent effigy had something of a revival during the 19th-century Gothic revival, especially for bishops and other clerics.

Some of the best-known examples of the form are in Westminster Abbey in London, St Peter’s Basilica in Rome, Santi Giovanni e Paolo, Venice (twenty-five Doges), and the Basilica of Santa Croce, Florence.

== Antiquity ==
=== Egyptian ===
The religious beliefs of the societies that produced the earliest Egyptian effigies (which date to c. 2700–2200 BC, during the Old Kingdom) are unknown but are usually assumed by modern archaeologists to have commemorated either fallen Gods or members of royalty. Their meaning can only be guessed at: modern archaeologists see them as depictions intended to house the souls of the dead, intended to identify them as they travel through the realm of the dead. The earliest known tomb effigy is that of Djoser (c. 2686–2613 BC), found in the worship chamber of the Pyramid of Djoser. The effigies were typically smaller than life-size.

Funerary masks were used throughout the Egyptian periods. Examples range from the gold masks of Tutankhamun and Psusennes I to the Roman "mummy portraits" from Hawara and the Fayum. Whether in a funerary or religious context, a mask served the same purpose: to transform the wearer from a mortal to a divine state. The Romans continued this tradition of idolatry and also created many other types of effigies. The faces are often clearly portraits of individuals.

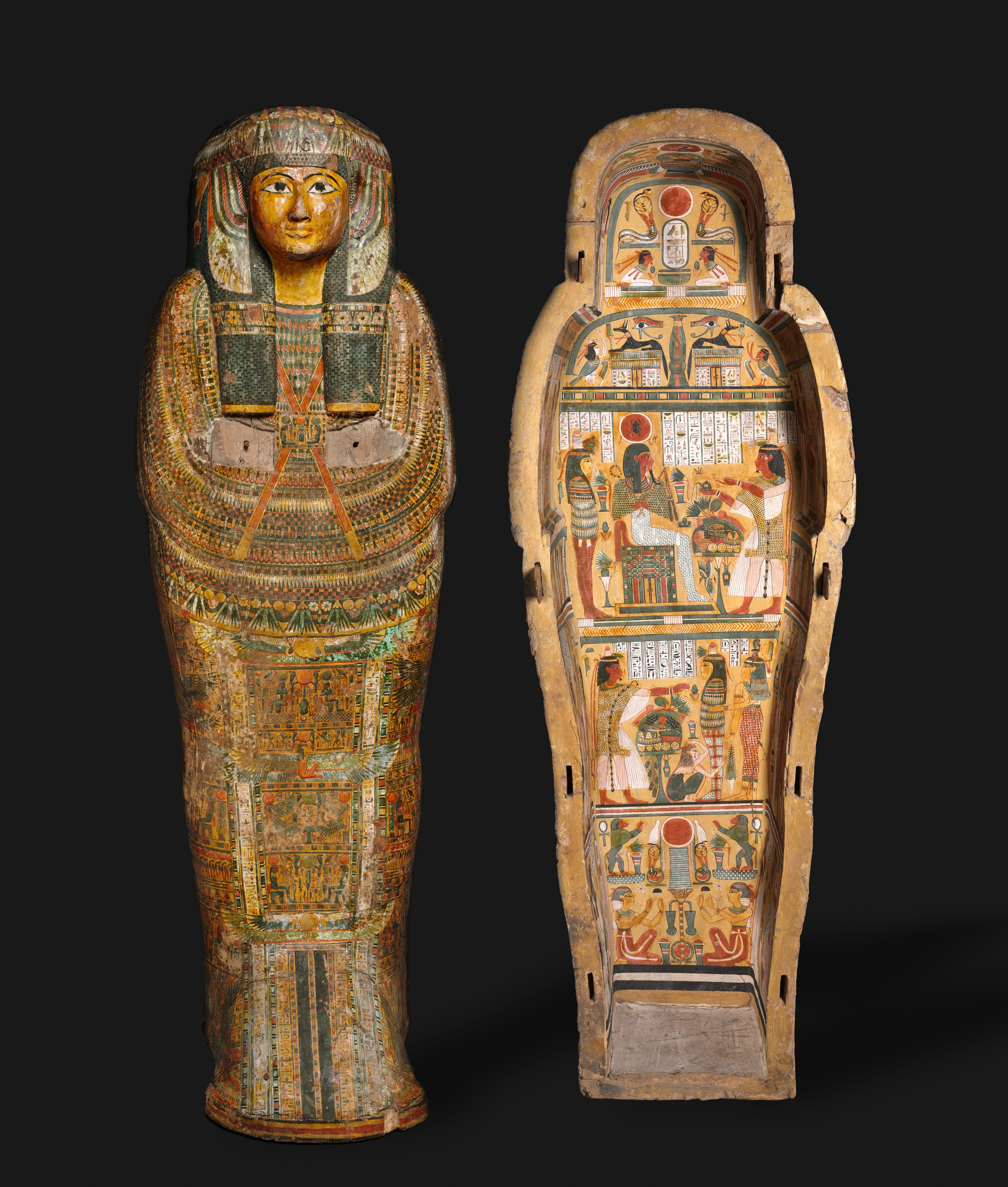
Coffin of Neskhons, c. 945-715 BC, Cleveland Museum of Art, Ohio

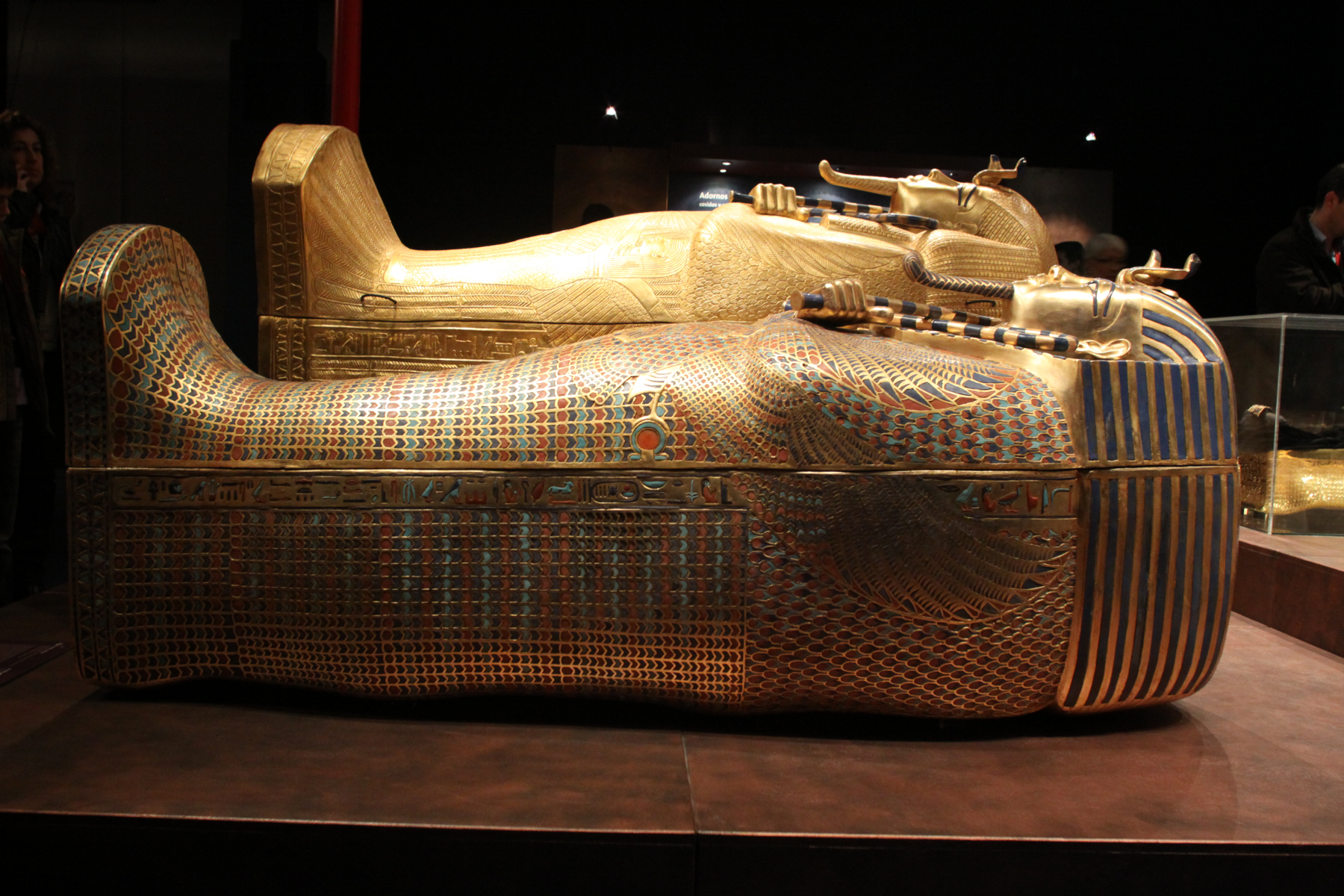
Replicas of the coffins of Tutankhamun, c. 1355–134 BC. The originals are in the Egyptian Museum, Cairo.

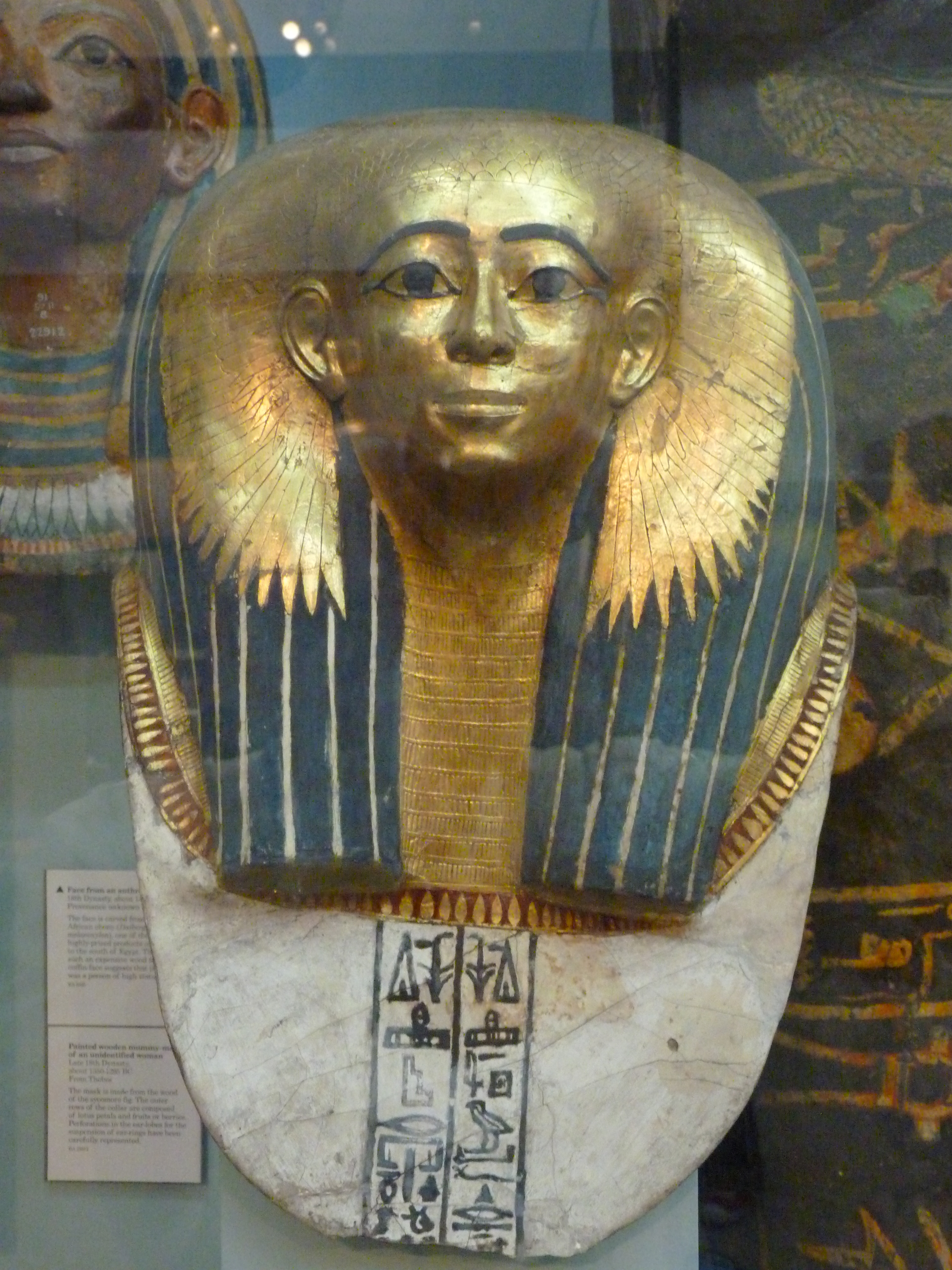
Mask of Sitdjehuti; c. 1500 BC; linen, plaster, gold and paint. British Museum.

=== Classical ===
Recumbent effigies were a common tradition in the funerary art of the Etruscans, an advanced civilisation and culture that developed in central Italy before 700 BC and flourished until the late second century BC. Their effigies were typically carved in high relief, and produced in a variety of materials, including ceramic, terracotta, marble, limestone and alabaster. Structurally, they fall into two categories: small squarish cinerary urns for cremation and near life-sized rectangular sarcophagi for burials, with cremation becoming more popular over the centuries. Etruscan culture viewed the dead as no less complete than the living and existing in a realm where they were forever either in despair or enjoying material comfort. From 500 BC, the effigies show the deceased as they looked while alive. They are often lavishly dressed and enjoying food and drink as if at a feast. They are typically reclining (as if alive) rather than recumbent (as if dead), with open eyes turned towards the viewer, and are often propped up on a pillow while leaning on their arm or elbow.

By the 7th century, the Etruscans were depicting human heads on canopic urns. When they began burying their dead in the late 6th century, they used terracotta sarcophagi, with an image of the deceased reclining on the lid, alone or with a spouse. The Etruscan style influenced late Ancient Greek, especially in the manner of showing the dead as they had been in life, typically in the stele (stone or wooden slabs usually built as funerary markers) format. Any aspects of the style were adapted by the Romans, and eventually spread as far as Western Asia.

Pre-historic Romans of Palatine Hill often cremated their dead (usually on pyres), while those of the Quirinal Hill would entomb the body. Eventually, the two practices merged, wherein the actual body was entombed, and an effigy of the deceased was burned. The Romans adopted the Etruscan tomb formats, maintaining the practice of showing the deceased as they were while alive. Roman sarcophagi were built from marble, and over time took on a more a contemplative, spiritual and redemptive iconographical tone, emphasising the deceased's former hierarchical role in society.

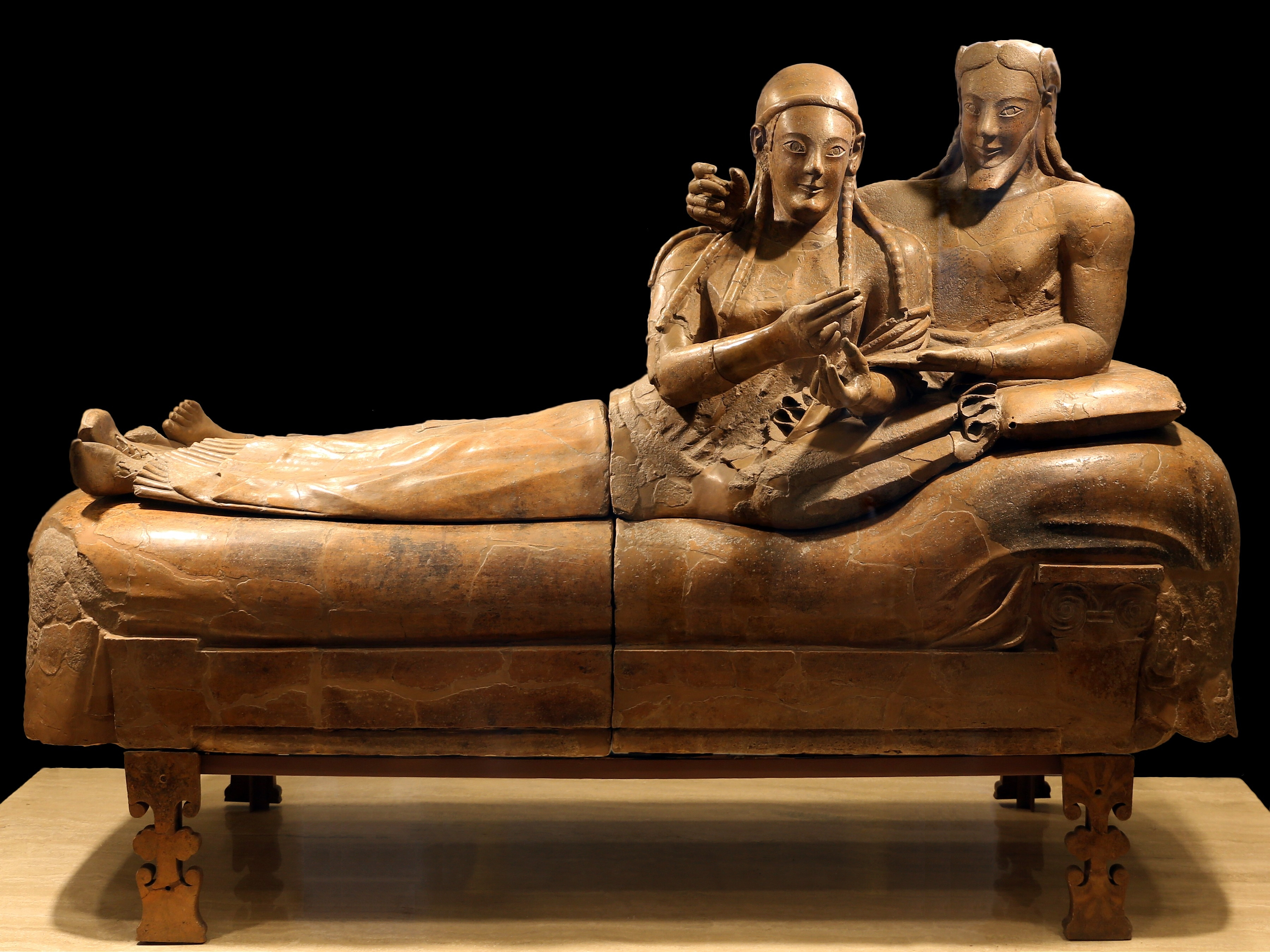
Sarcophagus of the Spouses, 530–510 BC. National Etruscan Museum, Rome, Italy.

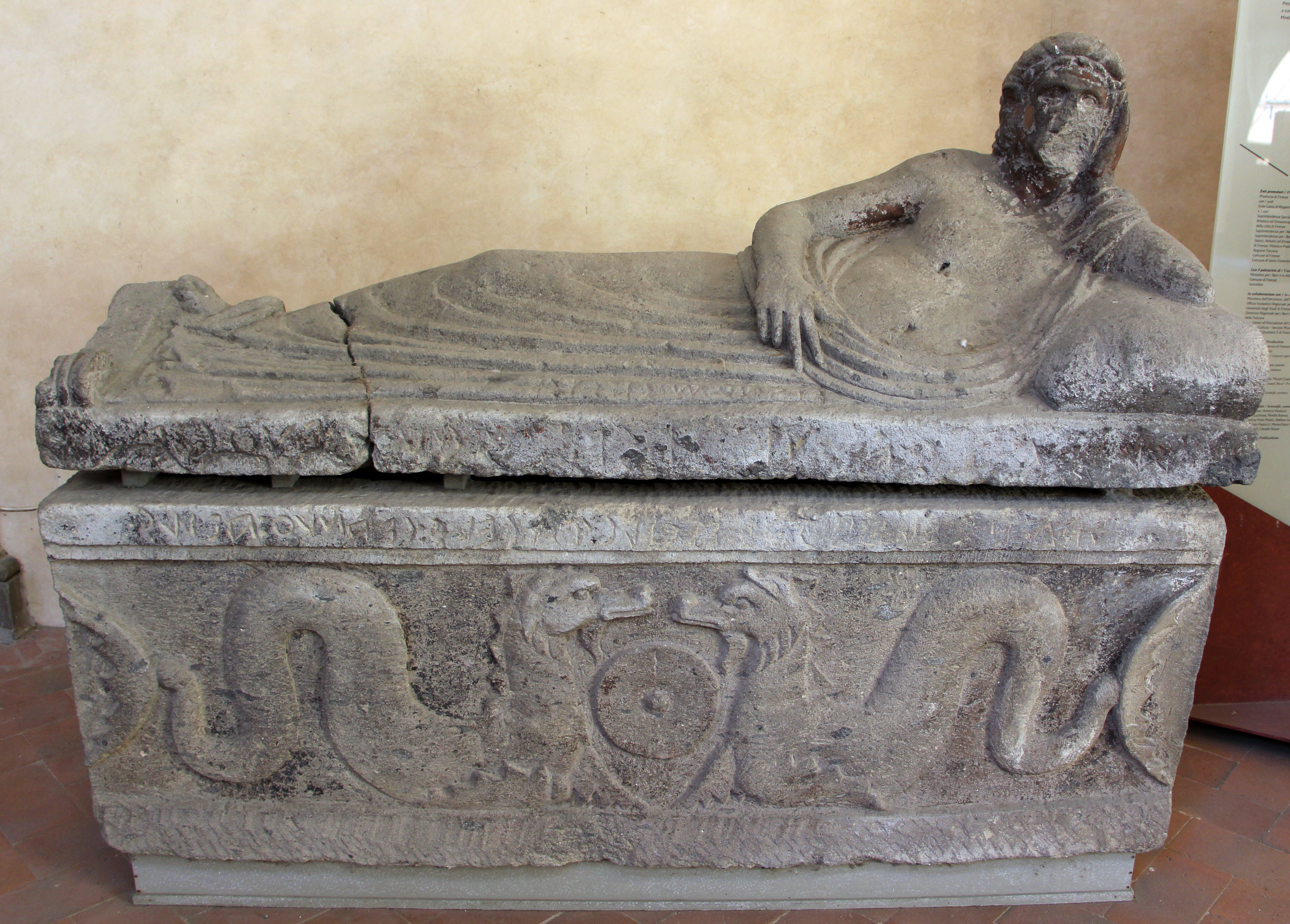
Sarcophagus in the Villa Corsini, Florence. 300-275 BC.

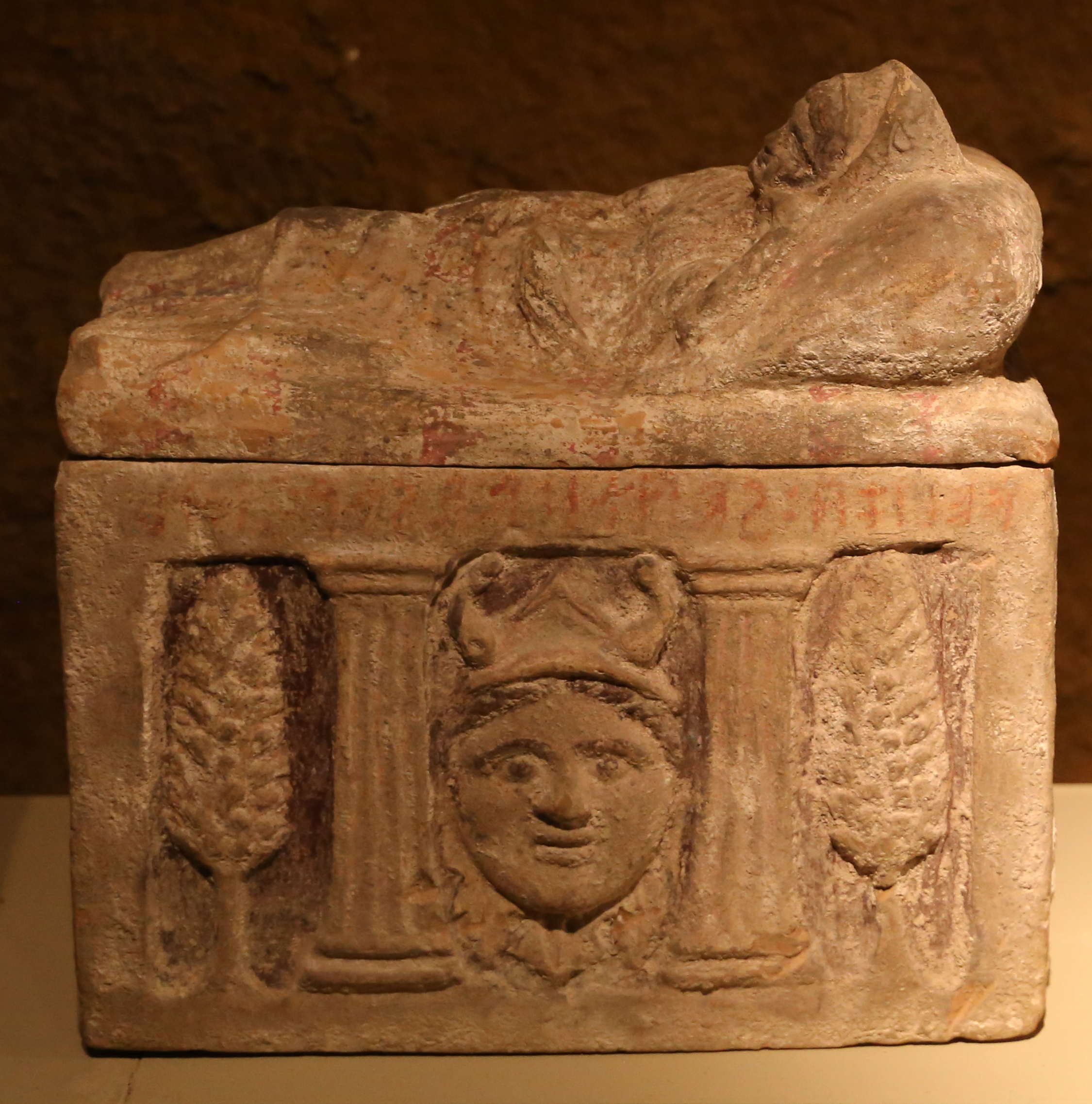
Funerary urn, c. 210–90 BC. Museo archeologico nazionale Siena, Italy.

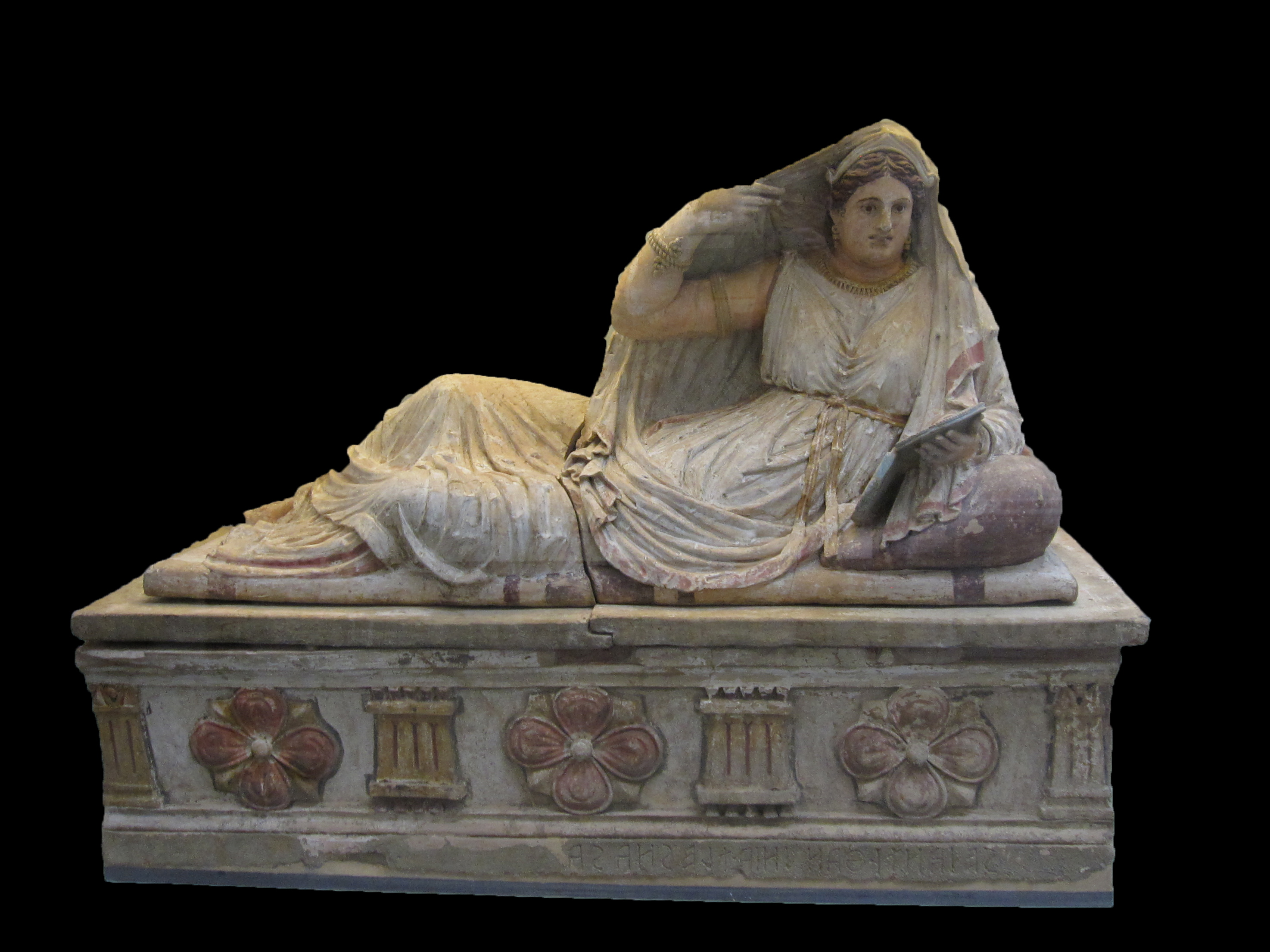
Sarcophagus of Seianti Hanunia Tlesnasa, c. 150–130 BC. Painted terracotta, British Museum, London.

== Medieval ==
=== Origin and characteristics ===
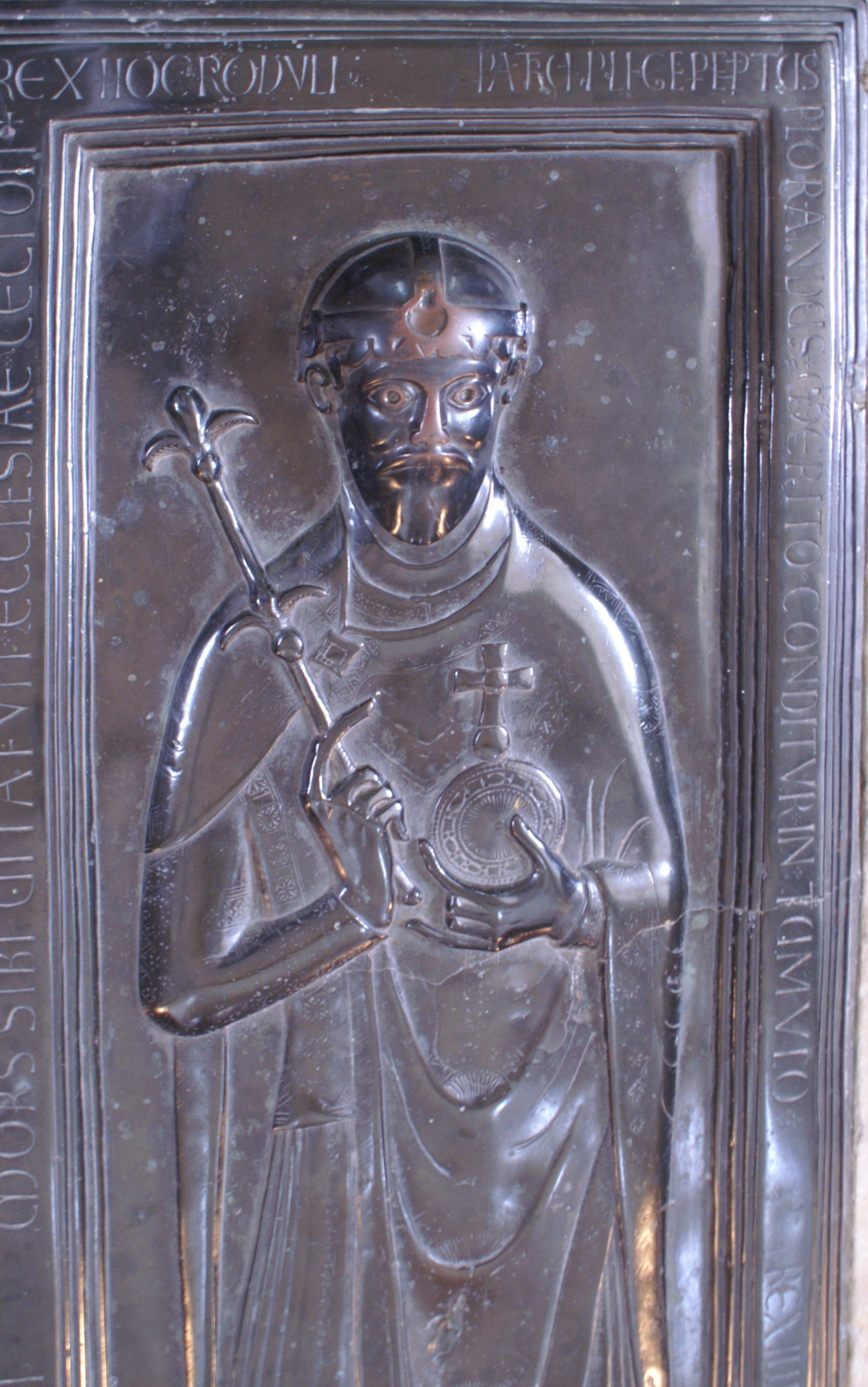
Bronze grave plate effigy of Rudolf of Rheinfelden, c. 1080–1084. Merseburg Cathedral, Germany.

The spread of Christianity throughout Europe introduced new attitudes towards death and the dead, and for the first time tombs were built in places of worship, that is churches. The first medieval recumbent effigies (gisants) were produced in the 11th century, with the earliest surviving example being that of Rudolf of Rheinfelden (d. 1080) in Merseburg Cathedral in Germany. These early effigies show the deceased (usually a royal, senior cleric or aristocrat) dressed in contemporary clothing. The format proliferated across Northern Europe in the late 12th century as it became popular amongst a growing class of wealthy elites who often commissioned their tombs years before their death, often seeking to cement their historical or spiritual legacy or —especially in early examples— restore a reputation tarnished by political or military defeat.

The art historian Marisa Anne Bass described the intention of medieval effigies as representing death "to make present an absence." Historians differ as to the historical influences behind their designs. Writing in 1964, the art historian Erwin Panofsky suggested that their design was based on Spanish tombs and mosaic from North Africa. Other art historians have highlighted a primary influence from Classical funerary monuments, particularly those from Etruscan culture. The historian Shirin Fozi recognises the influence of earlier formats, but thought that the idea of placing an "enlivened" representation of the dead above their grave is "too intuitive and too obvious to be read that ancient analogues were necessarily sources of inspiration." According to the English historian Alfred C. Fryer, a "hastily made and lively effigy" of the deceased "in his very robes of estate" became part of the funeral procession, after which the representation was left either above or near the burial spot. They were placed on many types of tombs; at first on tomb slabs before table or chest tombs (tumba) became the standard. Later, tombs built into cavities in walls became popular in France and Spain.

The early medieval effigies are typically made from limestone, sandstone, marble or more rarely bronze or wood (usually oak). Alabaster became popular from the early 14th century, and by 1500 in England was the most popular the core material. Bronze remained in use; however, due to its intrinsic value, such tombs were often dismantled and the material sold on; today only English examples survive.

The early "chest tombs" were typically built from several stone panels, with a cavity (often filled with rubble) to support the effigy. They were designed to give the impression that the body had been placed within it, but the corpse was usually buried in a vault below or beside the monument. Recent excavations indicate that some 14th-century chests acted as containers for the body. However, relatively few medieval tomb monuments have been opened. Notable examples where the body was placed inside the chest include the tombs of Henry III of England (completed c. 1290) and Edward I (d. 1307), both in Westminster Abbey, London. When the latter tomb was opened in 1774, the remains were found in a marble coffin placed on a bed of rubble.

=== Romanesque (France) ===
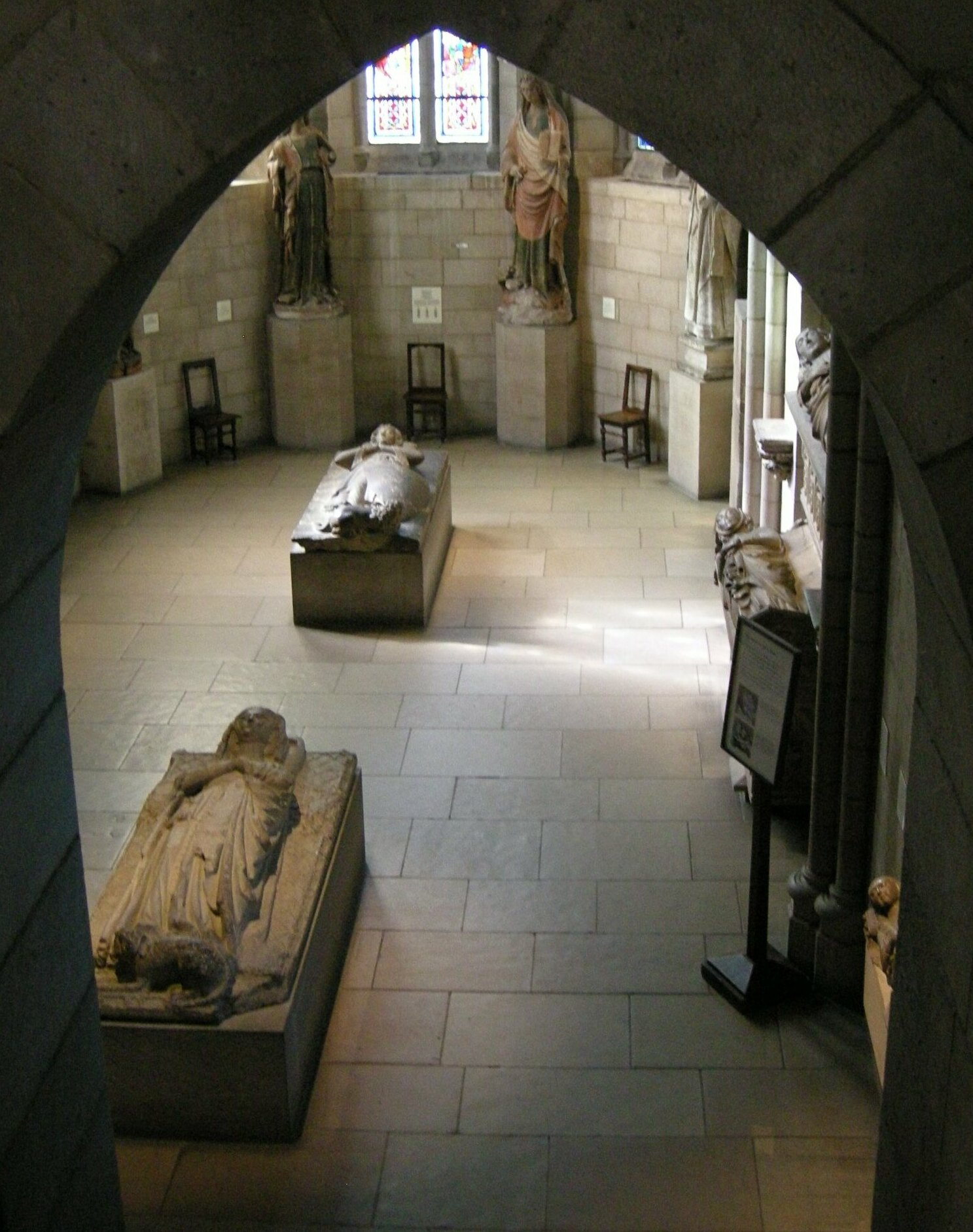
Tomb effigy of Jean d'Aluye (foreground), French, 13th century. Originally in the Abbey of La Clarté-Dieu in Northern France, now in the Cloisters, New York.

The earliest medieval examples are German; the style was significantly developed by French sculptors during the Romanesque style between c. 1080 and c. 1160. By the 12th century, German, Dutch, Belgian, Spanish effigies largely followed the forms and iconography of the French models and had begun to adapt elements of the emerging Gothic style.

Romanesque effigies were typically carved from white marble or alabaster, and depict the deceased's body and face as they appeared in life, with no marks of illness or death. The faces are idealised rather than accurate portrayals and often show the deceased much younger than they had been at death. The effigies are always recumbent—as if dead- and, by the 14th century, with hands clasped in prayer. The most common material is carved marble, alabaster, or wood, with some examples cast in bronze or brass. The faces and hands of the few surviving wooden effigies are made from wax or plaster. The effigies were usually polychromed to simulate life, but in most cases, the paint has long since worn away.

The first secular examples appeared in the 12th century following the establishment of the knightly class. These tombs were usually placed on flat marble slabs supported by tomb-style chests (also known as tumba) decorated with heraldry and architectural detailing. The earliest examples showing armour date from the 1240s, with the most numerous surviving examples in England. The two most common poses in these English types are knights pulling out their sword or lying cross-legged; these are particularly English motifs, although there are some Polish and French examples.

While the Romanesque and Gothic tombs were produced in great numbers —especially in France and England— it is estimated that over half were destroyed during the iconoclasm in the early modern period, and more again during the French Revolution. The majority of English churches were not subject to such destruction.

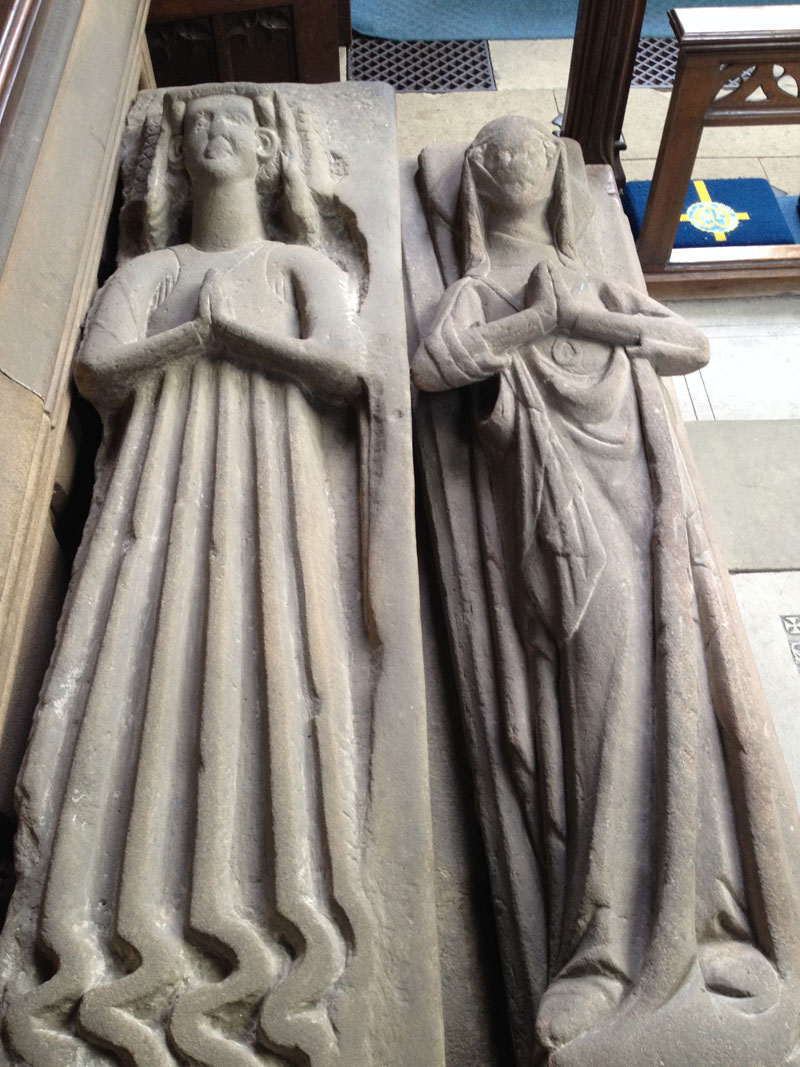
Effigies in the Church of St John the Baptist, Tideswell, Derbyshire, England. 12th and 13th centuries.

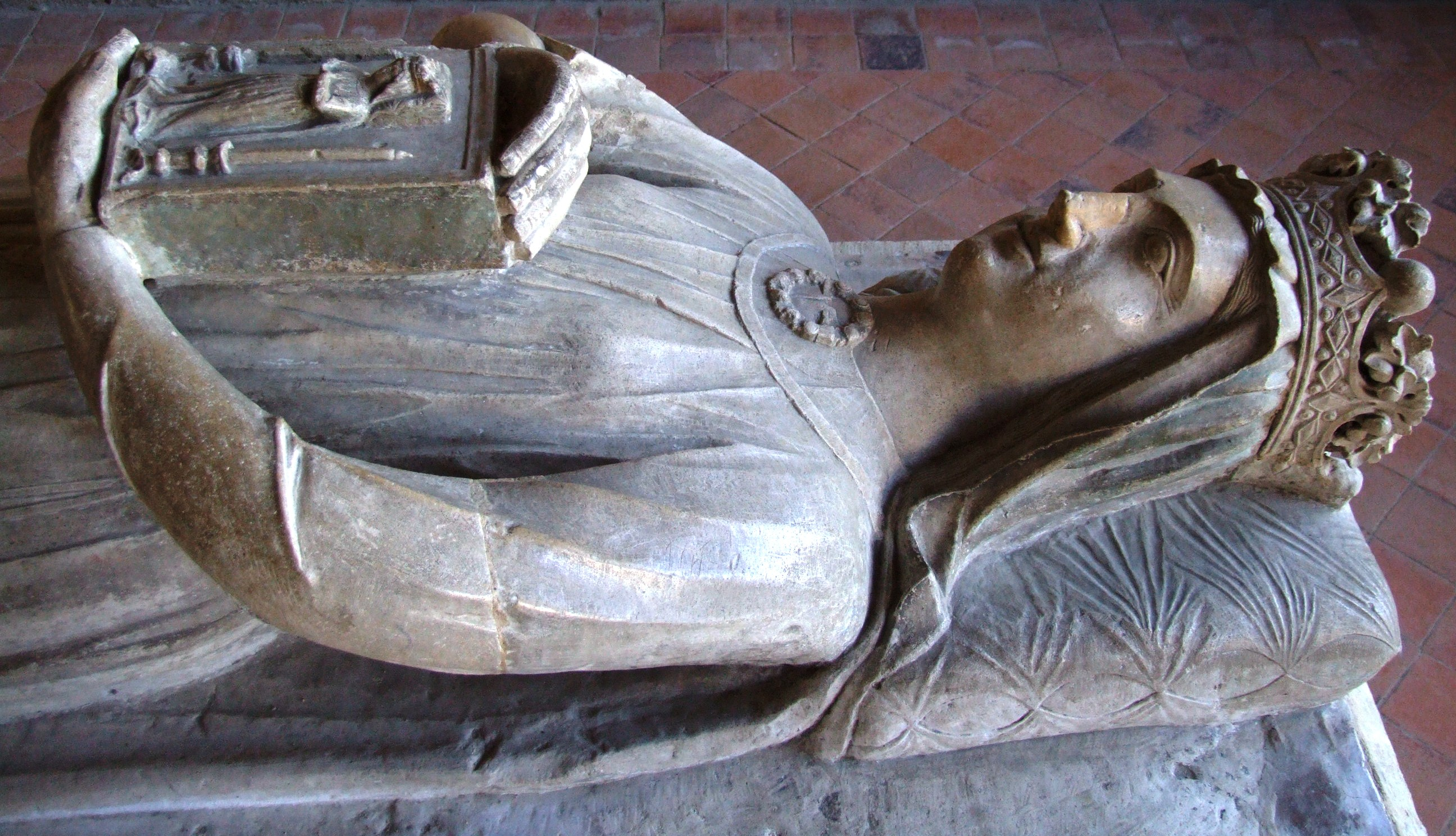
Effigy of Berengaria of Navarre (d. 1230), Queen of England as the wife of Richard the Lionheart. L'Épau Abbey, Le Mans, France.

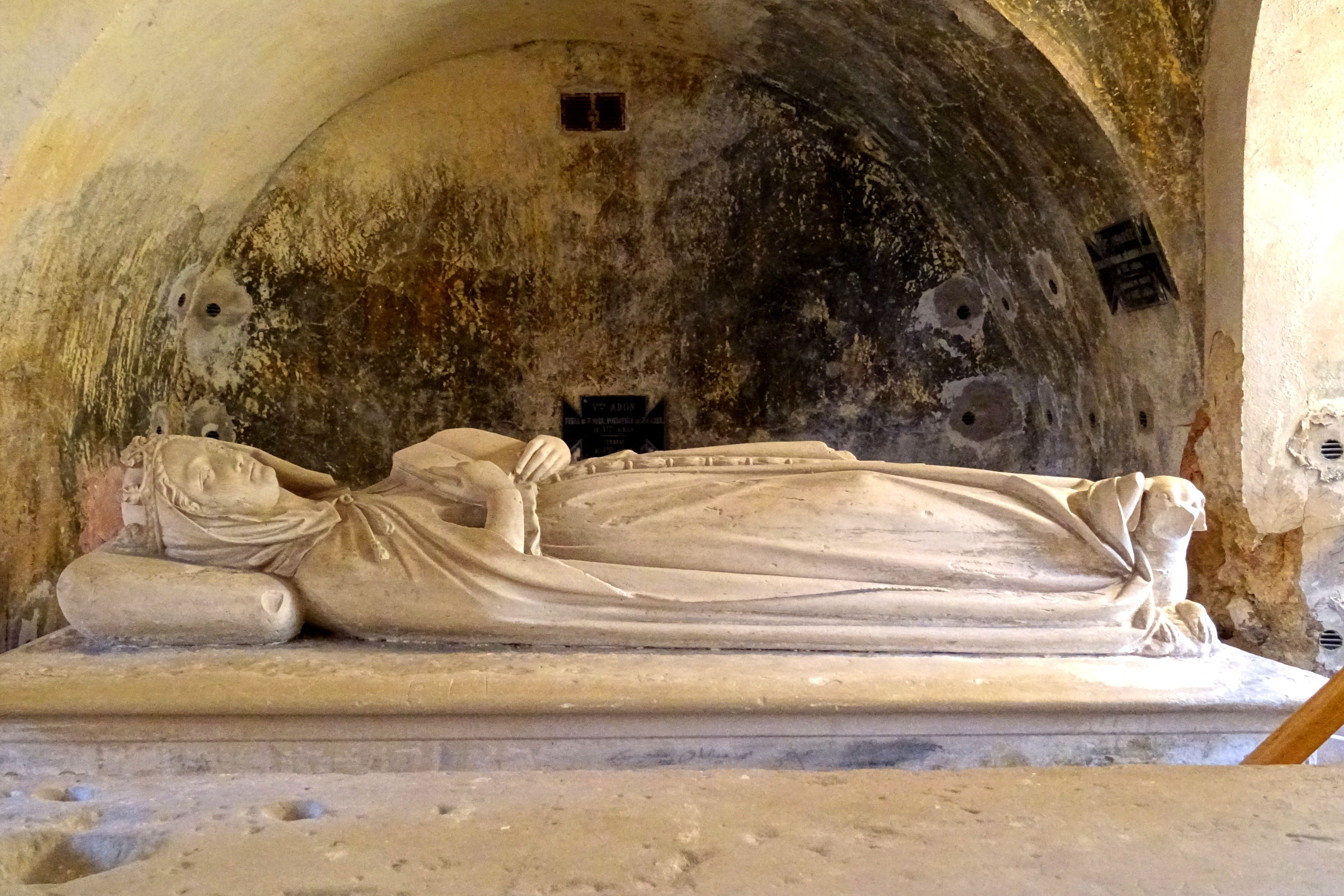
Tomb of Ozanne, 13th century. Crypte Saint-Paul, Jouarre Abbey, France.

=== Britain ===
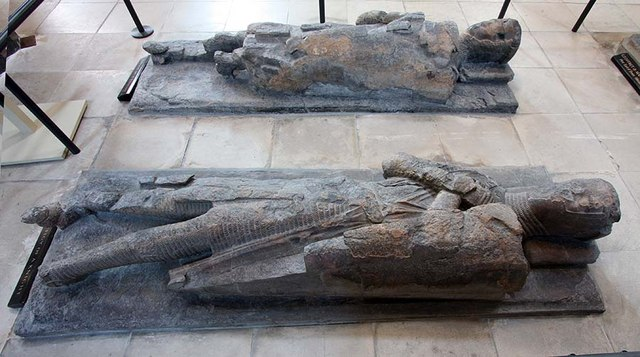
Effigy of a knight, Temple Church, London

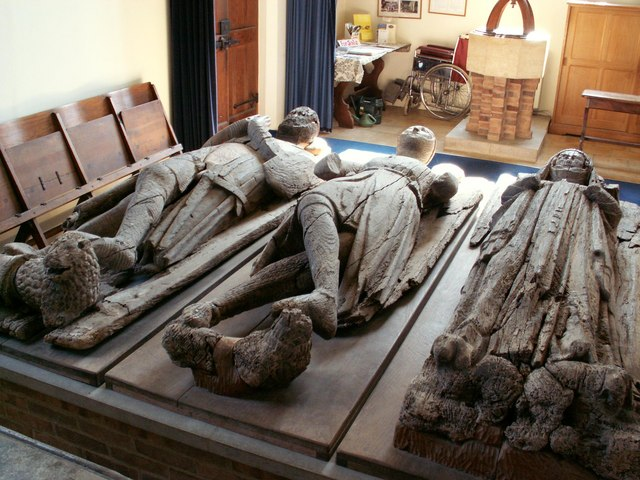
Wooden effigies in St Peter and St Paul's church, Little Horkesley, Essex

The larger-scale production of effigies began in Britain in the middle of the 13th century, following the emergence of the knightly class. Tomb effigies are the most numerous type of surviving medieval statuary in Britain, with around 250 extant secular effigies from each of the 13th and 14th centuries alone. The most numerous early examples are representations of knights, with over 150 such effigies surviving from the 13th century and almost 200 from the 14th century. They are typically below life-sized and often show the deceased with a sword drawn or their legs crossed. Many of those of knights produced during the Plantagenet reign are known as "dying Gauls", given they show the deceased reaching for their sword as if they are either about to commence battle or are struggling against death.

The 13th-century knightly effigies are less rigid and statuesque than French examples, reflecting what the historian H. A. Tummers describes as a "more worldly and less spiritual outlook". Those in the Temple Church, London are among some of the earliest examples and include the effigy of Geoffrey de Mandeville, Earl of Essex (d. 1144) and that of the Anglo-Norman statesman William Marshal (d. 1219), a benefactor of the Knights Templar who served Henry II.

The drawing of the sword is intended to show, according to the art historian Rachel Dressler, their "physical dynamism". The cross-legged pose is more difficult to interpret. It was long thought to indicate that the deceased had participated in the Crusades or had been a Knight Templar, but these theories are now rejected by scholars.

Britain's periods of iconoclasm were not as severe as those in northern continental Europe and so the number of surviving number of examples exceeds even that of France. However a great number were destroyed during waves of iconoclasm between the 14th century and the 17th-century Cromwellian Wars of the Three Kingdoms. The main period of destruction was during the 16th-century Reformation led by Henry VIII, when many monastic settlements were destroyed, including many English royal tombs.

Due to the relative scarcity of appropriate stone material – especially in London and the surrounding counties – wooden effigies became common during the Romanesque period. Given wood's perishability, only five examples survive, all in oak. (Note: The wooden effigies include those on the tombs of John de Pitchford in Shropshire, William de Valence in Westminster Abbey and William Longespée in Salisbury Cathedral, Wiltshire.)

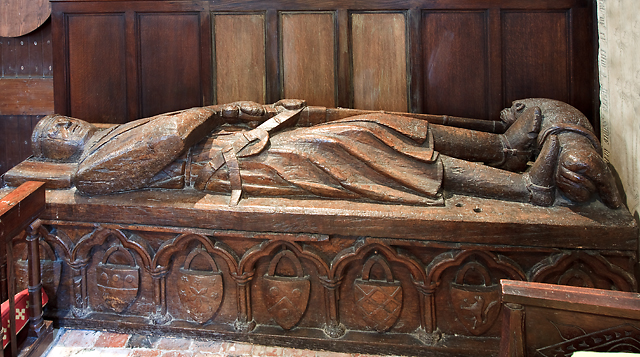
Carved oak Tomb of John De Pitchford (d. 1285). Pitchford, Shropshire.

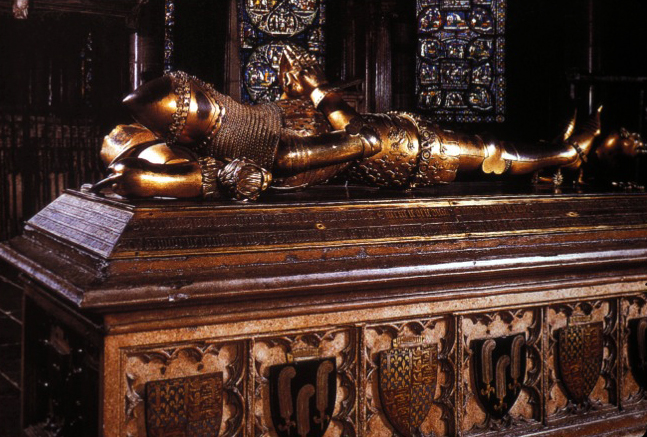
The cast gilt copper-alloy Tomb of Edward, the Black Prince, after 1376, Canterbury Cathedral, Kent

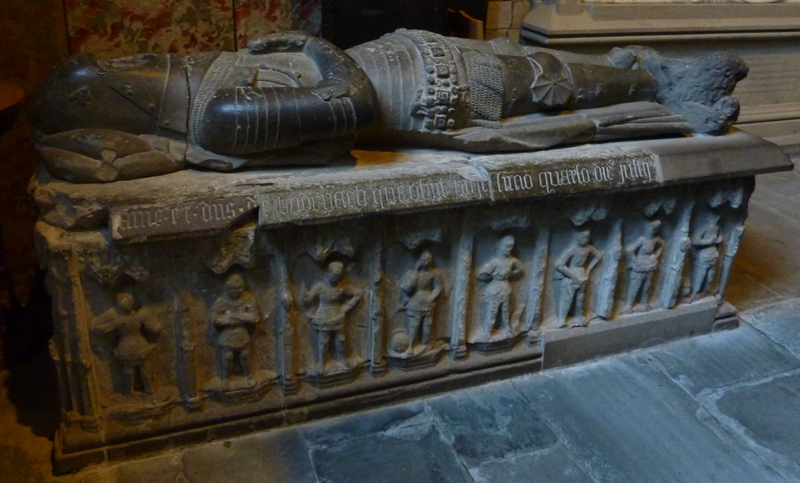
Tomb of the Wolf of Badenoch (d. 1394), Dunkeld Cathedral, Perth and Kinross

=== Burgundy ===
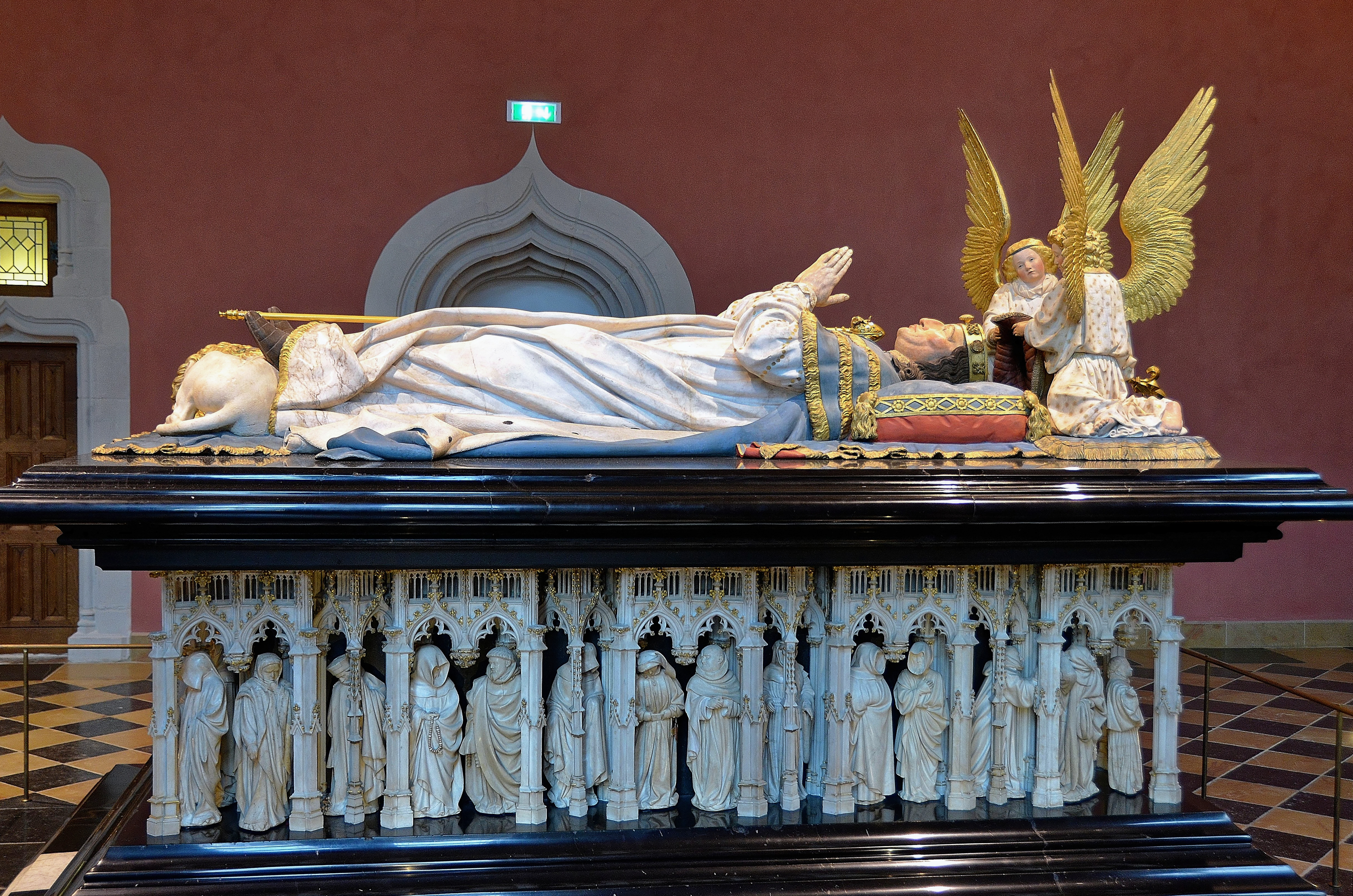
Tomb of Philip the Bold, c. 1381–1410. Musée des Beaux-Arts de Dijon, France

The Dukes of Burgundy, who ruled in present-day Belgium, Luxembourg and northern France during the 14th and 15th centuries, were recognised throughout Europe as patrons of the arts. Through their cultivation of artists such as the sculptor Claus Sluter and the painters Jan van Eyck and Rogier van der Weyden (who is thought to have painted some of their effigies), they became key in the development of Early Netherlandish art and the wider Northern Renaissance.

The iconography of Burgundian tombs develops forms and motifs found on monuments for French Kings in the Basilica of Saint-Denis, near Paris. The now lost tomb of Joan of Brabant (c. 1457) is probably the earliest example; its rows of mourners positioned below the slab were reproduced in later Burgundian tombs, including those of Isabella of Bourbon, constructed between 1475 and 1476, where the mourners were directly copied from Joan's monument.

The style became influential across Europe with the tomb of Philip the Bold (d. 1404), built over 30 years from 1381 by the sculptors Jean de Marville (d. 1389) and Sluter (d. 1405?) for the Chartreuse de Champmol, near Dijon, which also houses the tombs of his son John the Fearless (d. 1419) and John's wife Margaret of Bavaria (d. 1424). Philip's tomb is described by the art historian Frits Scholten as "one of the most magnificent tombs of the Late Middle Ages".

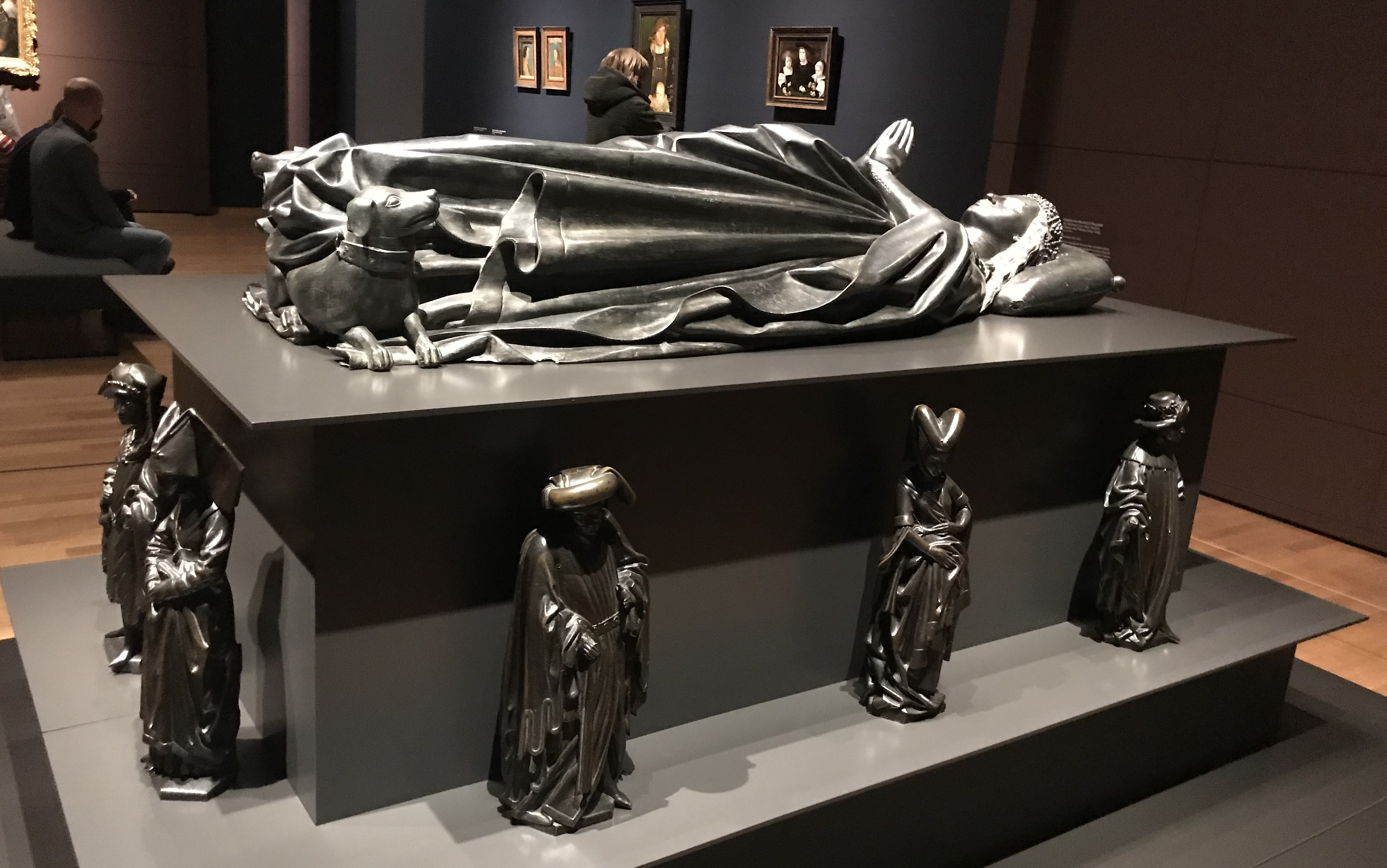
Isabella of Bourbon's effigy (1475–1476) displayed with its 10 surviving pleurants

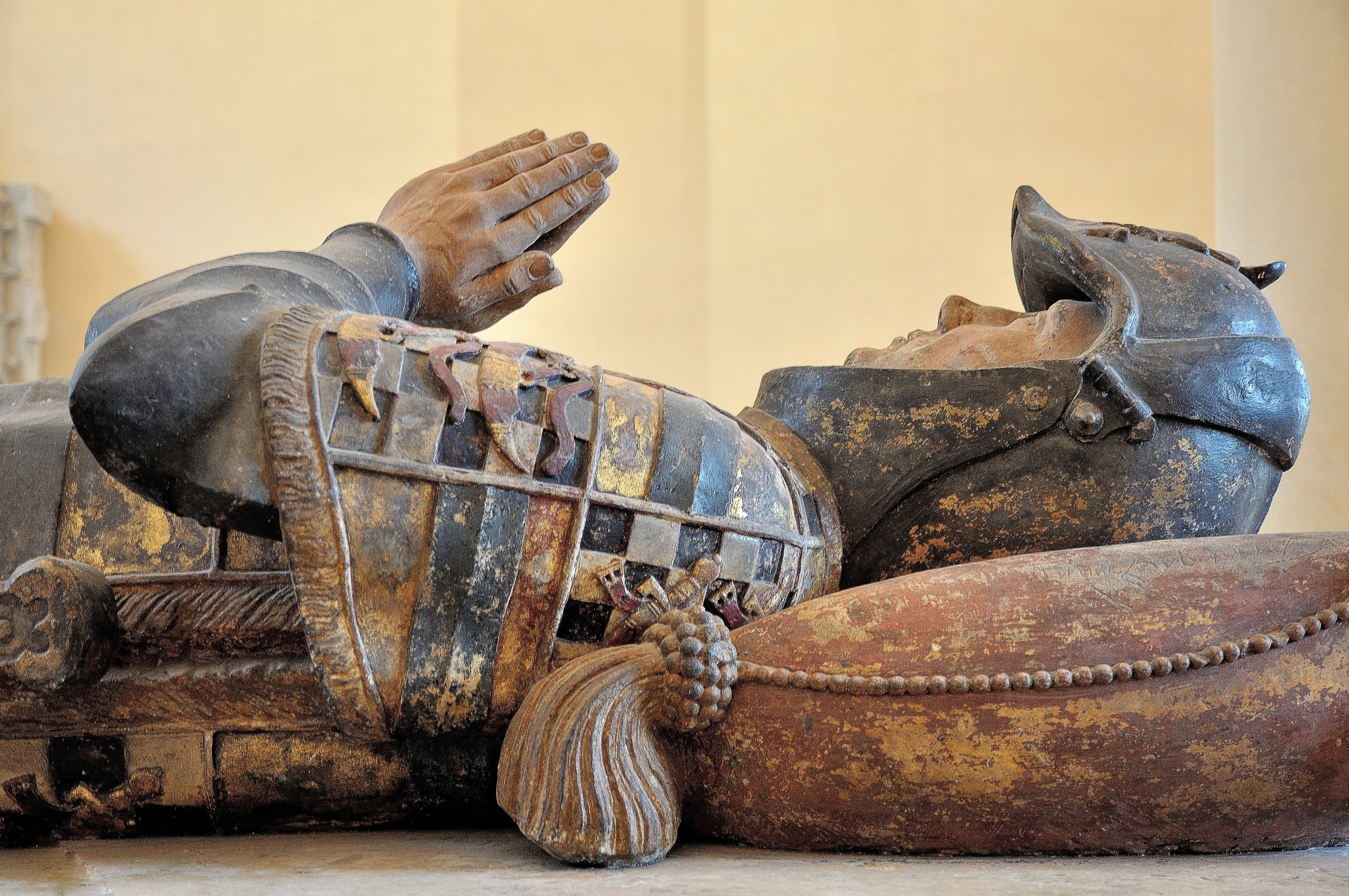
Tomb of Philippe Pot (d. 1493) with armour and a heraldry shield

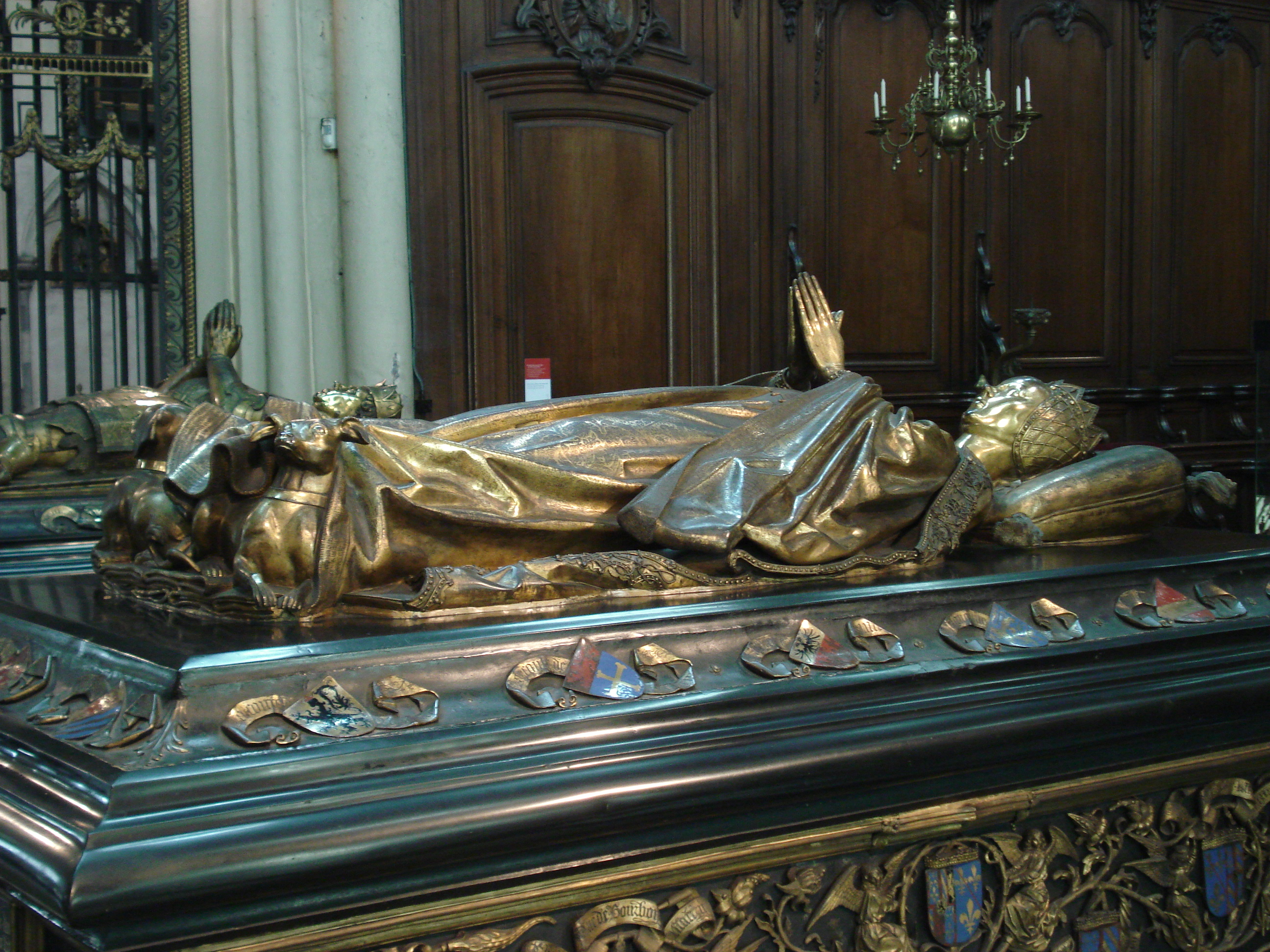
Tomb of Mary of Burgundy, 1501. Church of Our Lady, Bruges.

The Burgundian effigies are characterised by naturalistic faces, open eyes, angels above their heads, and animals (either dogs or lions) at their feet. Philip's is made from polychromed white marble which gives a natural pallor. His head rests on a cushion, and he has an angel on each side to watch over him, presumably guiding him into the afterlife. The open eyes are intended as an affirmation of the Resurrection, as are the prayers contained in the books held by some of the mourners in the niches.

=== Eastern Europe ===
Several 16th-century Polish tombs contained cross-legged effigies. However, the iconography is believed to differ from English examples, and rather than denoting a knight killed on the battlefield, the pose instead probably symbolizes either the princely status of the deceased or, according to the historian Jan Białostocki, "their state of quiet and blessed repose".

== Renaissance ==
While many of the innovations in medieval tomb effigies occurred in Northern Europe, the influence of Renaissance sculpture is evident in Italy from the early 15th century and later in Spain. While the structure of the tomb monuments stayed largely faithful to the earlier Romanesque and Gothic traditions, the iconography began to reflect the societal shift in attitude towards the dead. This is seen particularly in the incorporation of secular and humanistic imagery, as earlier the religious imperatives behind tomb design, desire to licit intercessory prayer from the viewers to quicken the passage of the soul through purgatory.

The architectural settings became more elaborate and incorporated classical elements such as putto, sirens, centaurs and Roman-style profile heads. The tombs and their effigies incorporated and merged recent sculptural and painterly innovations with classical traditions. Most significantly, non-recumbent effigies became more popular, with variations including the deceased lying upwards on their side, kneeling in prayer, or even standing. The upper portion of the Tomb of Valentina Balbiani (d. 1572) shows her in life, with a book and dog, reclining in a restful pose reminiscent of Etruscan effigies. A bas-relief on the tomb's base shows her decomposed corpse in the transi style.

Their design preoccupied a number of old masters who became involved in their design and construction, including Donatello and Bernini.

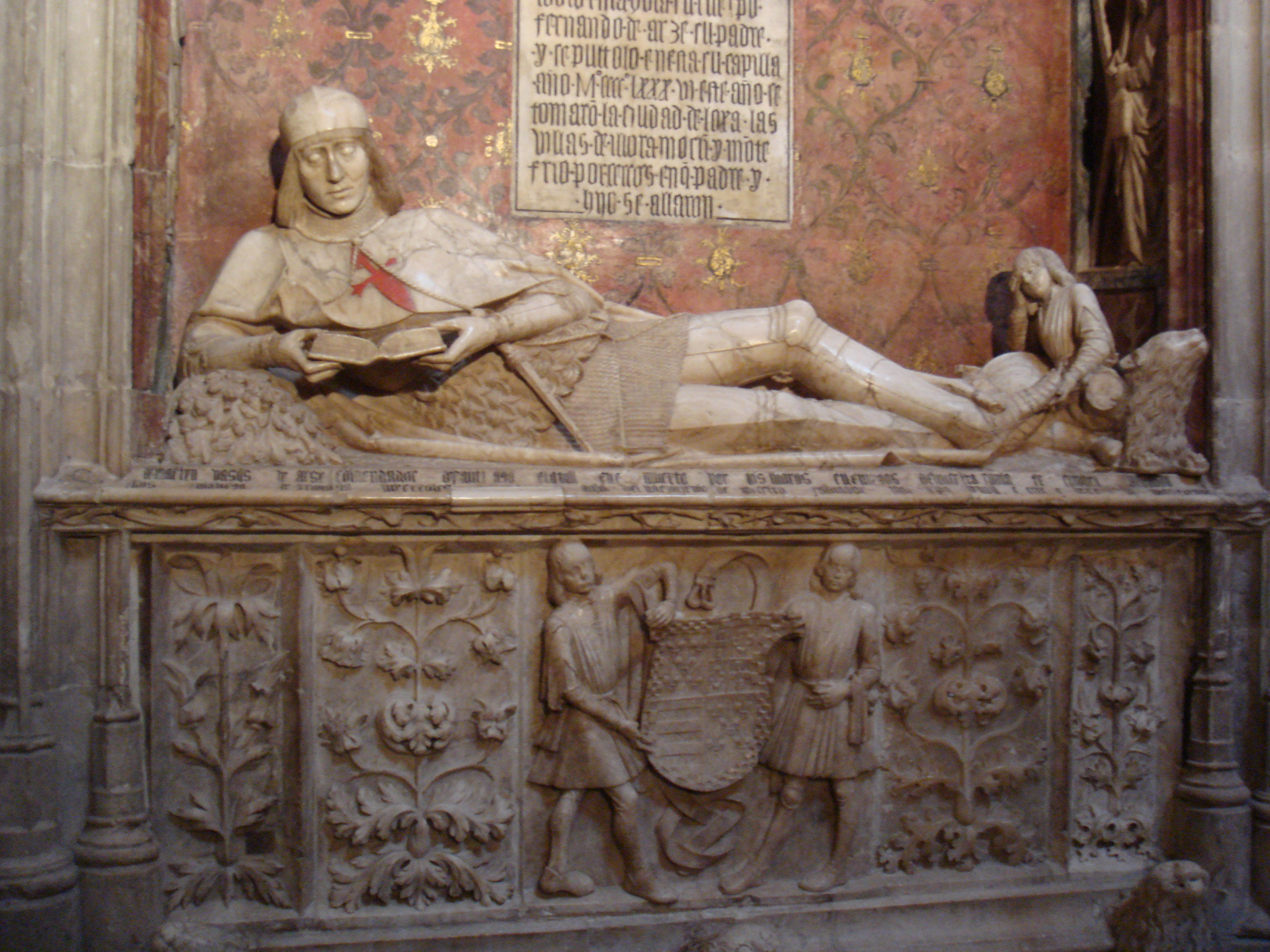
Tomb of Martín Vázquez de Arce (d. 1486), Sigüenza Cathedral, Spain

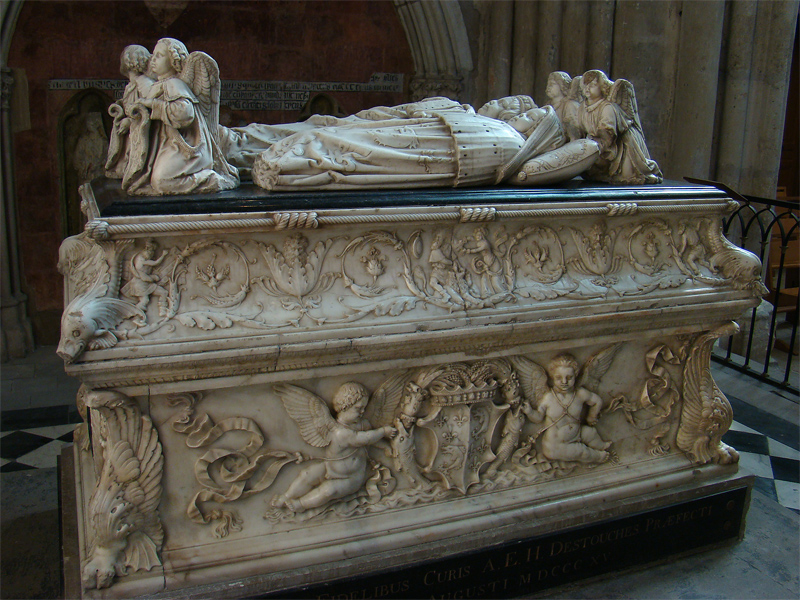
Tomb of the sons of Charles VIII and Anne of Brittany, 1506 Tours Cathedral, France

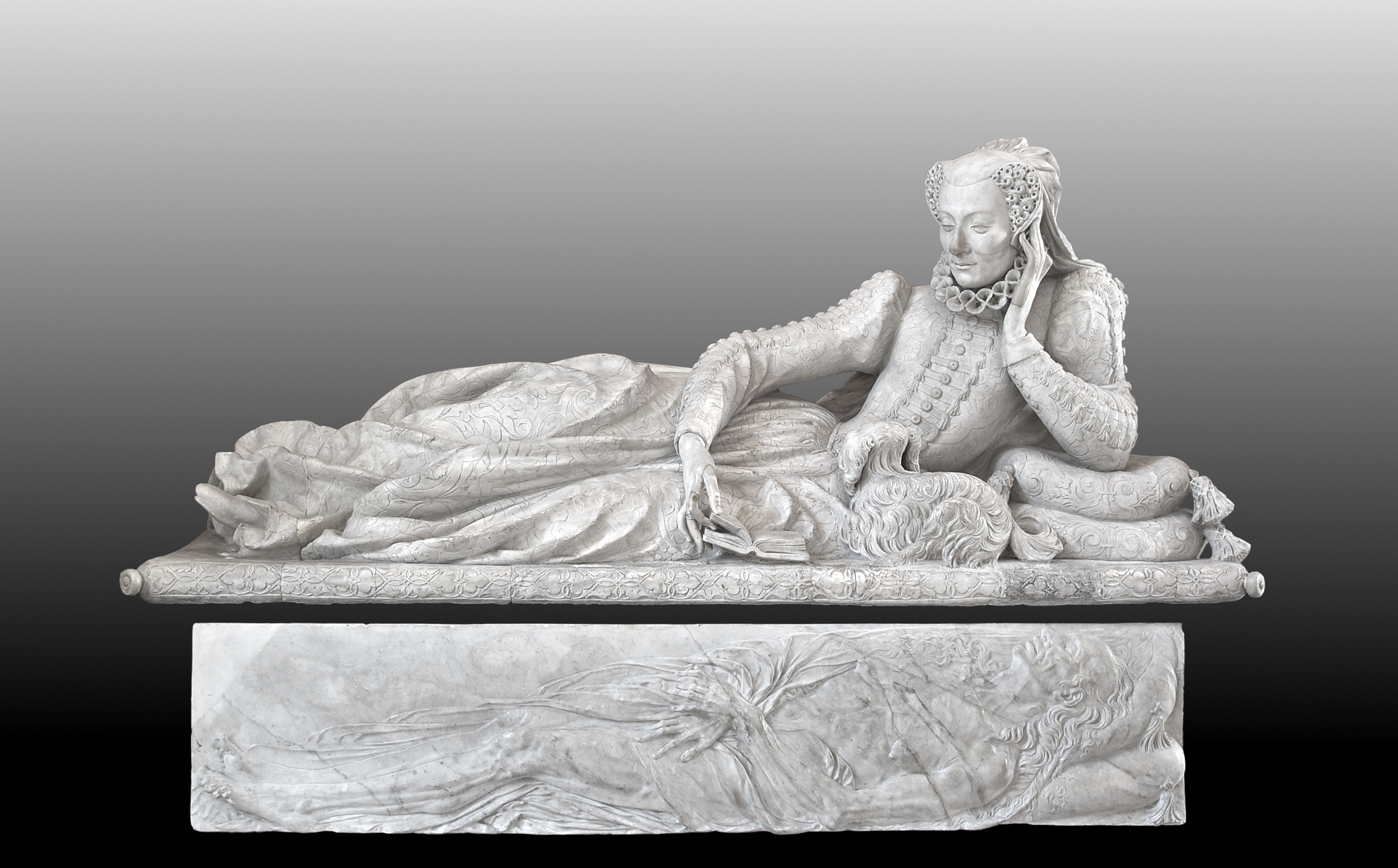
Tomb of Valentina Balbiani, Germain Pilon, c. 1580. Louvre, Paris

== Modern ==
=== Impact of the French revolution ===
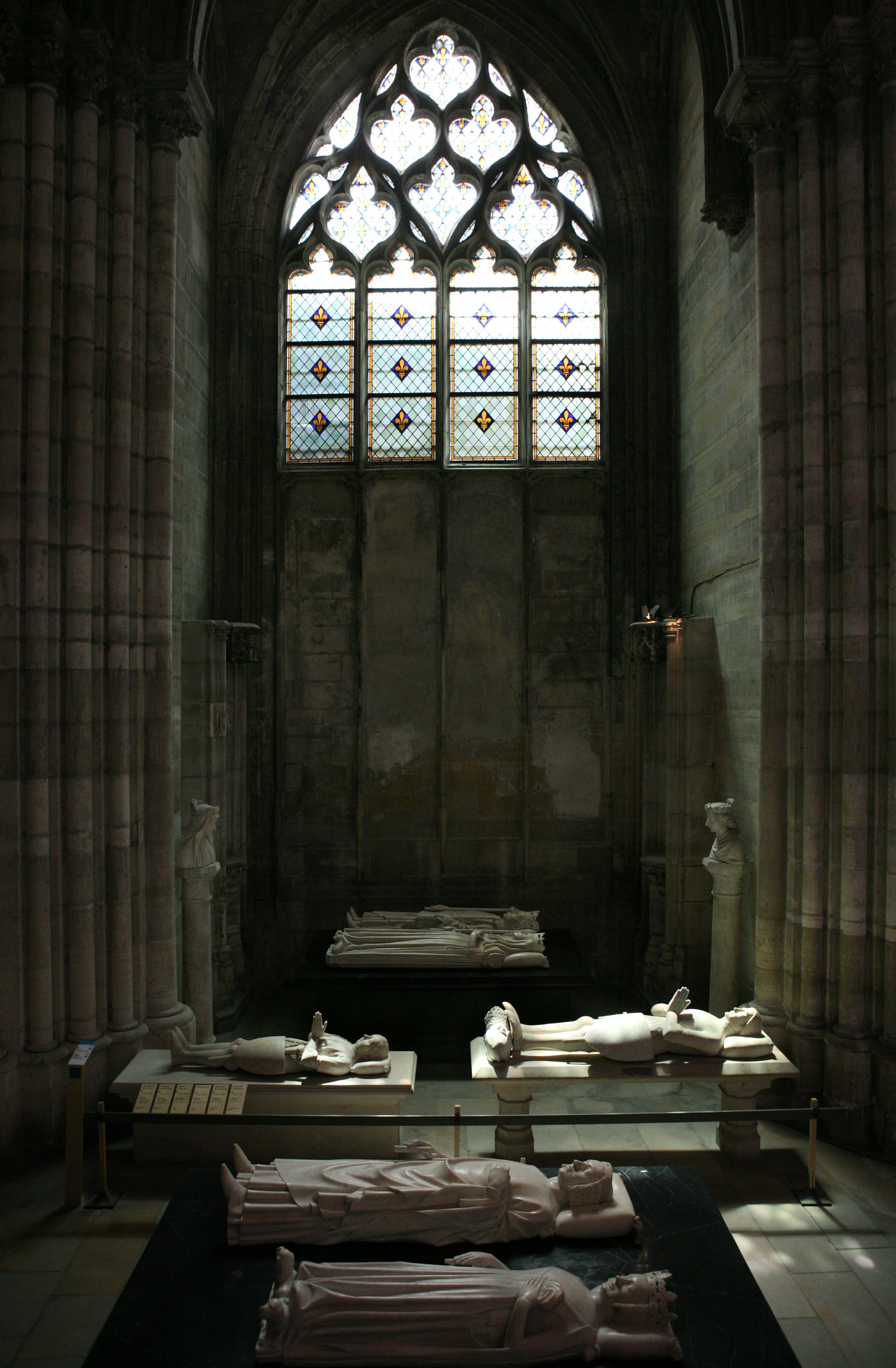
The restored royal tombs in the Basilica of Saint-Denis, Paris

European tomb monuments adapted innovations from other forms of sculpture during the early modern period, including non-European influences. However, in part driven by Enlightenment attitudes towards religion, the human body and the possibility of an afterlife, by the 1750s, effigies had largely fallen out of use across Europe. Although the format remained popular in England, it became especially rare in France in the wake of the Revolution: in 1793 the leaders of the French First Republic decreed the destruction of the "tombs and mausoleums of the former kings" (which were mostly at the Basilica of Saint-Denis) to celebrate the first anniversary of the fall of the monarchy and the collapse of the Ancien régime system. (Note: The metal and lead extracted from the tombs was ordered to be recast as armour or armaments. The exhumed bodies were dumped in specially dug trenches, and while many were lost during the transfers, some were recovered and returned to their original burial sites in the 19th century.)

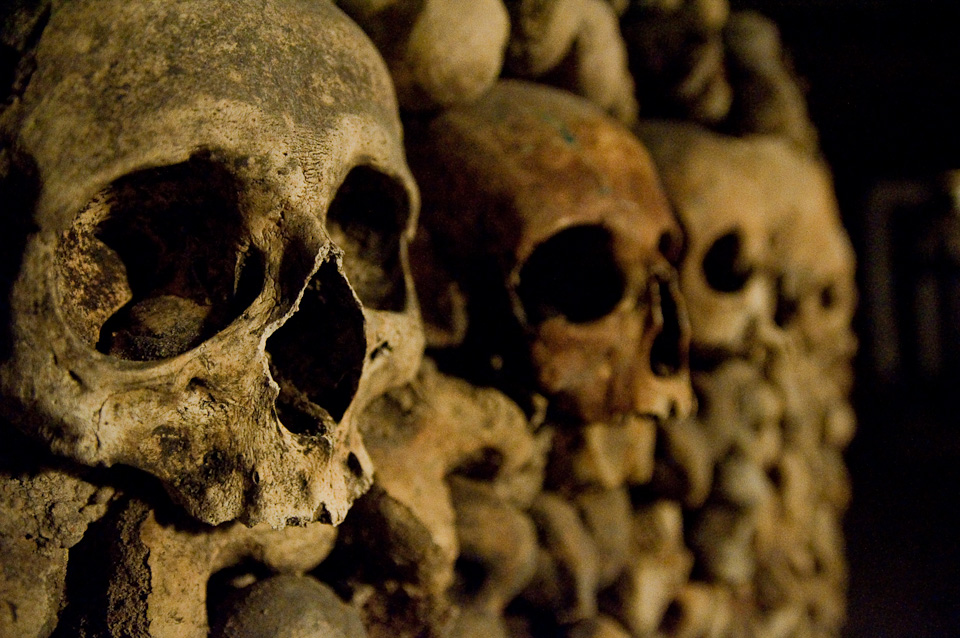
The Catacombs of Paris, where an estimated 6 million people are interred

Individual burial in large cities was discouraged in mainland Europe, in part due to a lack of available space and hygiene concerns. They were replaced by unmarked collective ossuaries such as the Paris catacombs where the dead were interred without Christian rites.

This change followed the general decline in religious belief after the revolution; Panofsky referred to European tombs from the 17th century onward as a "sceptical affair", while other art historians, including Fred Licht, noted a prevailing indifference towards funerary rites.

=== 19th-century ===
Recumbent effigies returned to vogue during the early 19th century when a series of major new cemeteries were founded, usually just outside the city bounds, the largest being Montmartre in Paris and Monument Cemetery in Milan. In France, cemeteries began to be seen as secular places where all –regardless of class– could visit their dead, and were managed by local government rather than the church. Thus effigies became commemorative rather than funerary and lost most of their religious associations. The change coincided with the transition between what the art historian Suzanne Glover Lindsay describes as the 'dramatic' baroque style to the 'cold' neoclassicism" styles. According to the Lindsay, individual French examples came to be regarded as "among the highest representations of modern...sculpture" and helped increase the reputations of many individual sculptors in a period when the craft had significantly less prestige than painting or architecture.

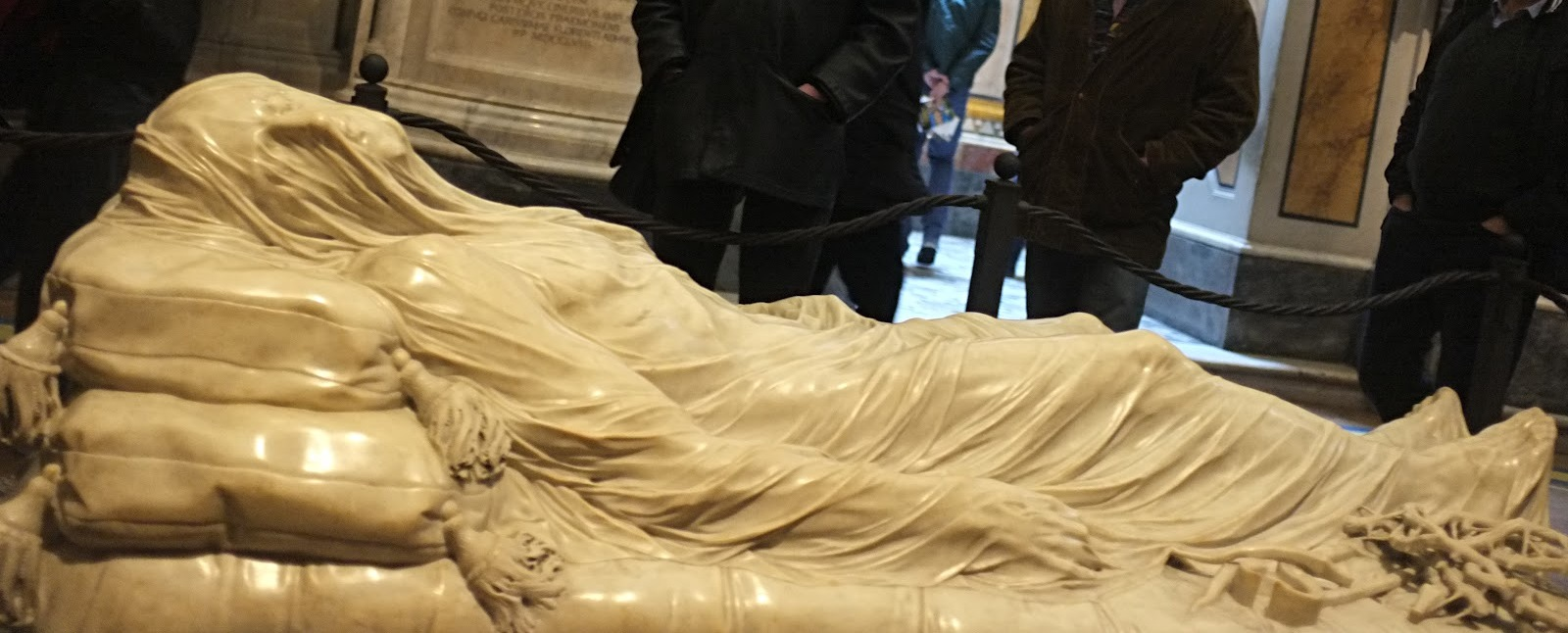
Veiled Christ, Giuseppe Sanmartino, 1753. Cappella Sansevero, Naples, Italy

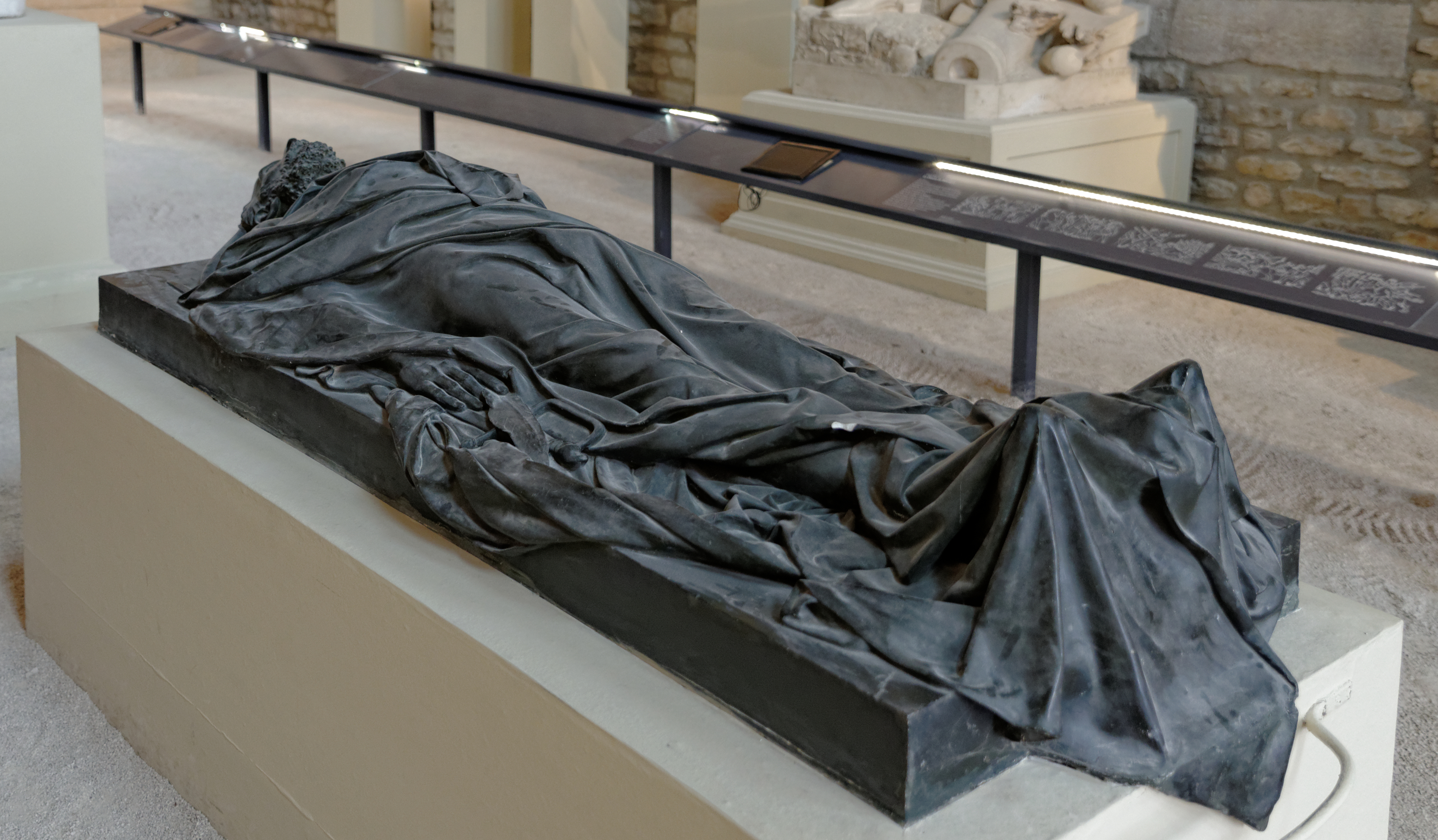
Gisant of Godefroy Cavaignac, Montmartre Cemetery, Paris. Completed 1847 by the French sculptor François Rude.

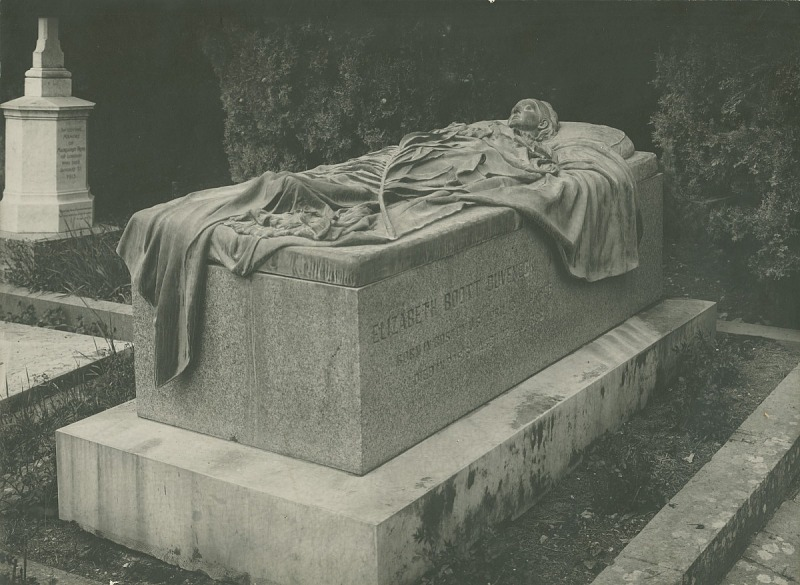
Tomb Effigy of Elizabeth Boott Duveneck, 1891. Cimitero degli Allori Florence, Italy.

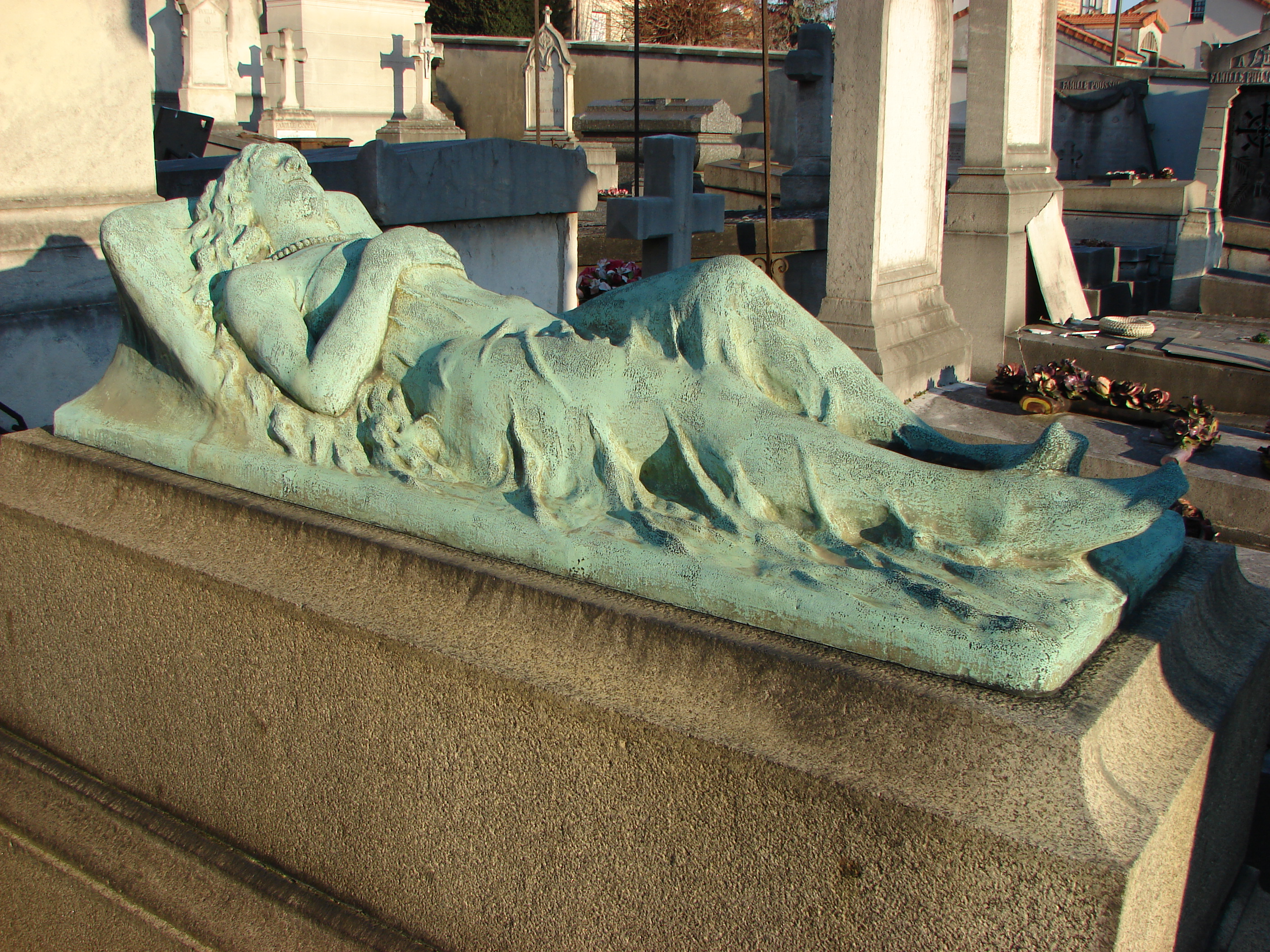
Tomb of Augustine Trochery, 1856–1887. Cimetière Carnot, Suresnes, France

== Material ==
The vast majority of medieval effigies were made from stone, usually either marble or alabaster. Wooden effigies became popular in southern England, and there are examples of copper-alloy tombs, especially in France and the former Burgundy lands.

== Types ==
=== Double tombs ===
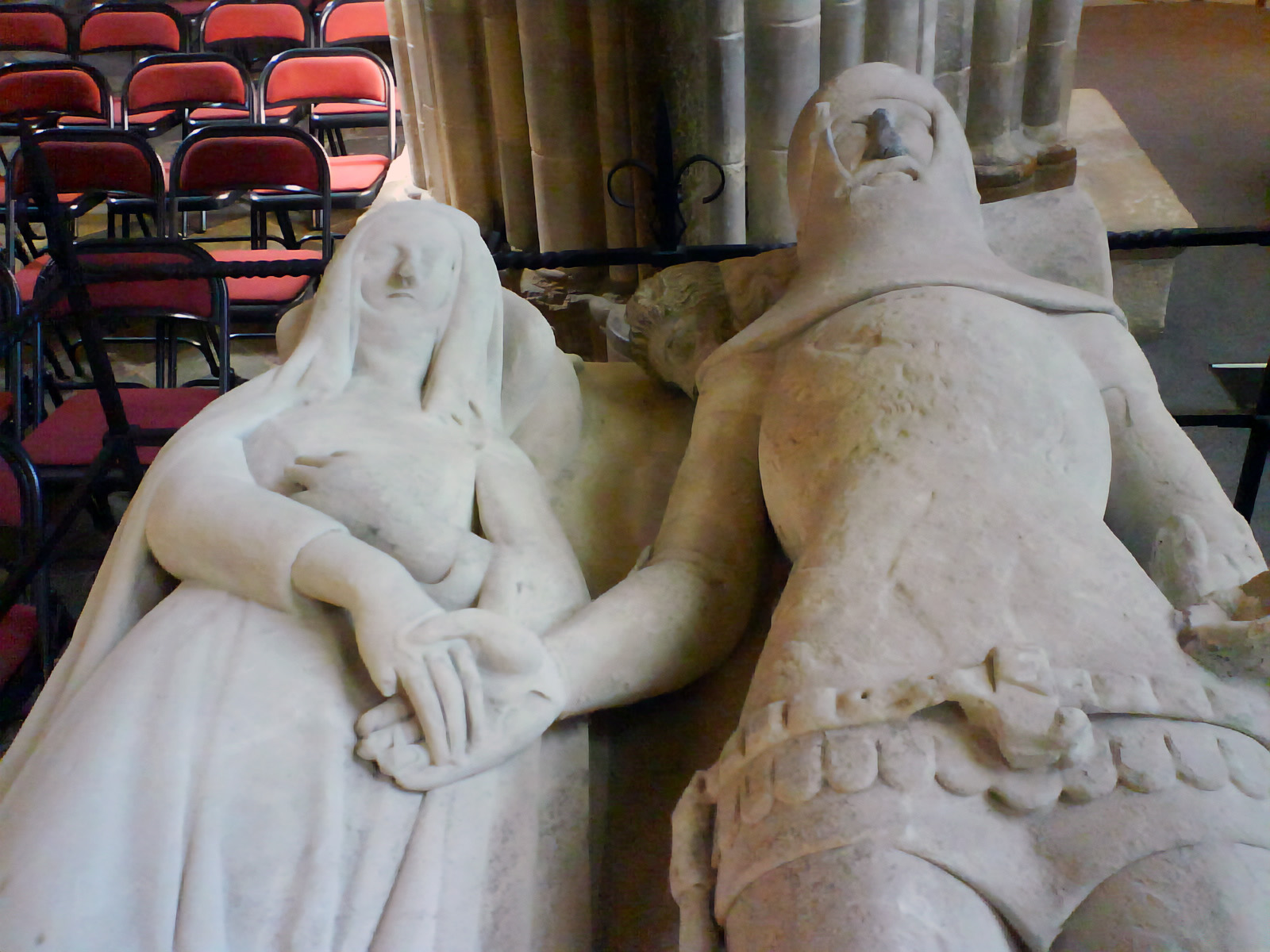
Effigies of Richard Fitzalan (d. 1376) and Eleanor of Lancaster (d. 1372), Chichester Cathedral, England

The practice of showing the effigies of a married couple side by side on the same plinth (or slab) began in France and Germany in the late 13th century and spread across northern Europe in the late 14th century. They can be categorised into two basic types: those where the effigies were created separately (at different dates of death) and later placed together on a single plinth, and those created at the same time from a single block of stone. In the former type, the tomb would often have been commissioned and built before the death of the remaining spouse. The practice may have begun as a device for legitimising controversial or contested royal marriages. In the same way, early Gothic double-tombs were not necessarily intended to celebrate the love between the couple, but to both reinforce the political aspect of their union.

Many late 14th- and early 15th-century examples show the couples holding hands. While the motif was undoubtedly used to reflect the affection between the couple, it also needs to be seen in contemporaneity ritual and legal context. Writing in 2021, the art historian Jessica Barker said that the gesture should be seen as analogous to a modern handshake that "both symbolised and effected an agreement between two parties." An early example is the now-lost tomb for Blanche of Lancaster (d. 1368) and her second husband John of Gaunt (d. 1399). The two most celebrated medieval examples are those of Richard II of England (d. 1400) and Anne of Bohemia (d. 1394), and John I of Portugal (d. 1433) and Philippa of Lancaster (d. 1415), which Barker describes as "placing extraordinary emphasis on the love between the king and queen". The well known Philip Larkin poem An Arundel Tomb, completed in 1964, describes and reflects on the effigies for Richard Fitzalan (d. 1376) and Eleanor of Lancaster (d. 1372) in Chichester Cathedral.

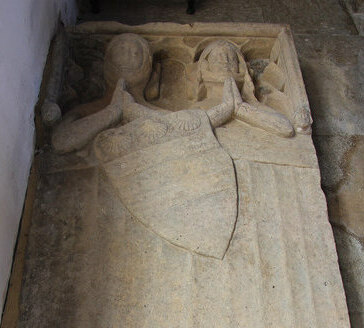
Effigial slab for Sir William de Bayous (d. c. 1327) and his wife. Church of St Stephen, Careby, Lincolnshire, England.

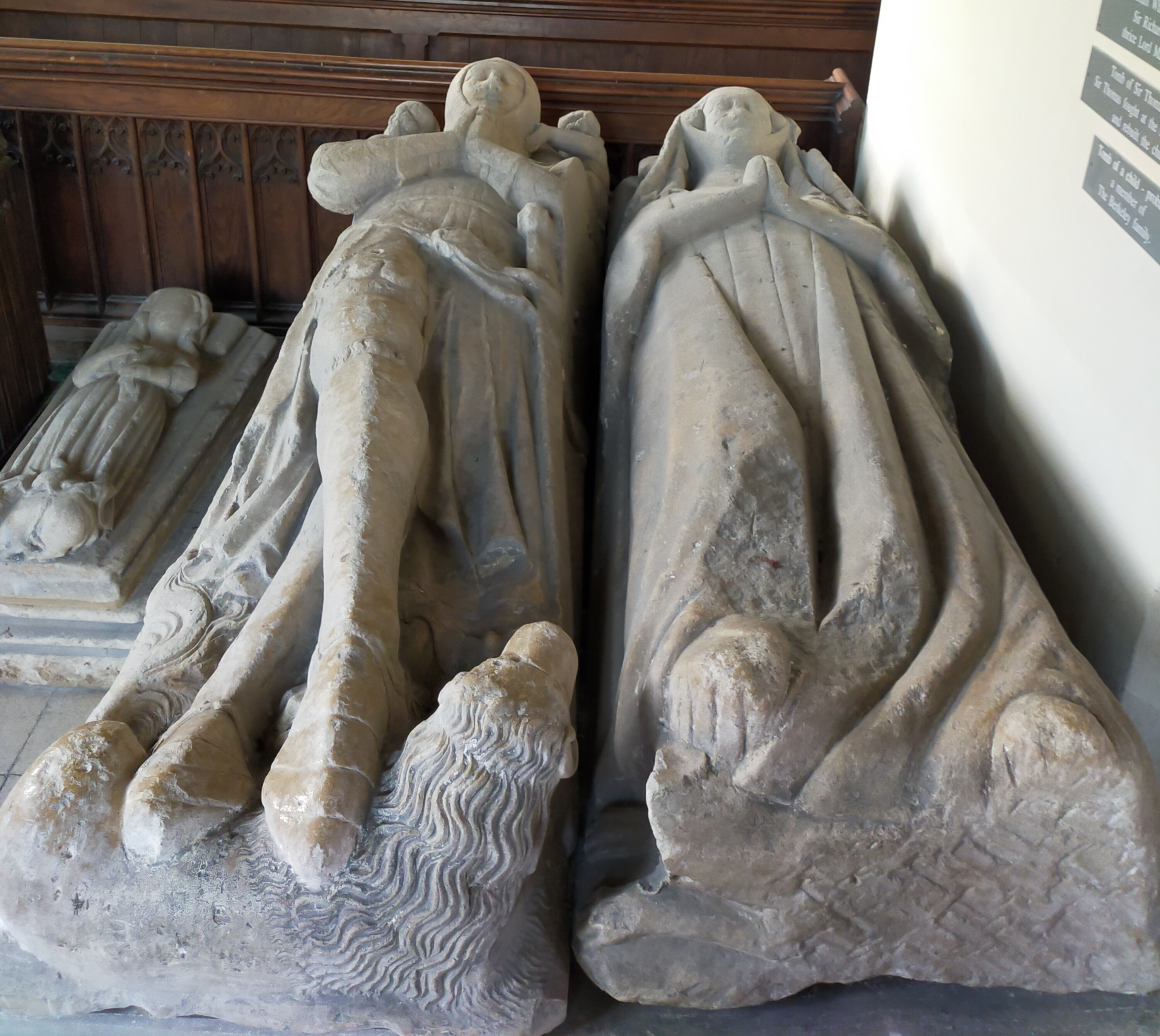
Tomb of Sir Thomas Berkeley (d. 1365) and his wife Joan, lady de Berkeley. St Giles's Church, Coberley, Gloucestershire, England.

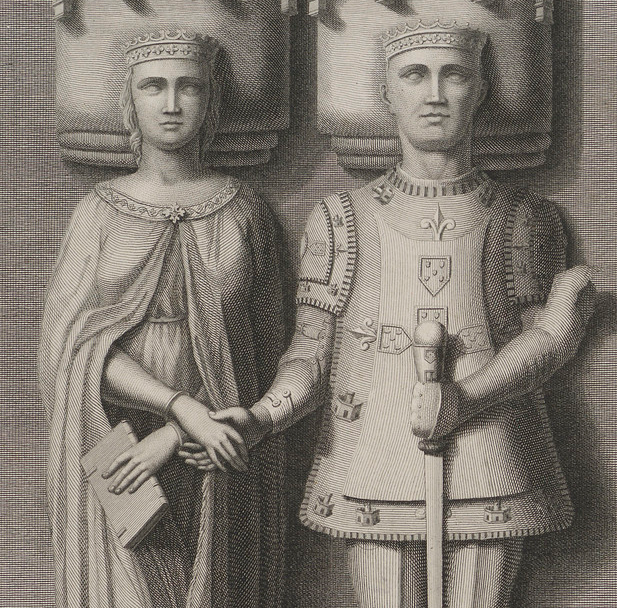
Drawing of the effigies of John I of Portugal and Queen Philippa of Lancaster. Batalha Monastery, Batalha, Portugal.

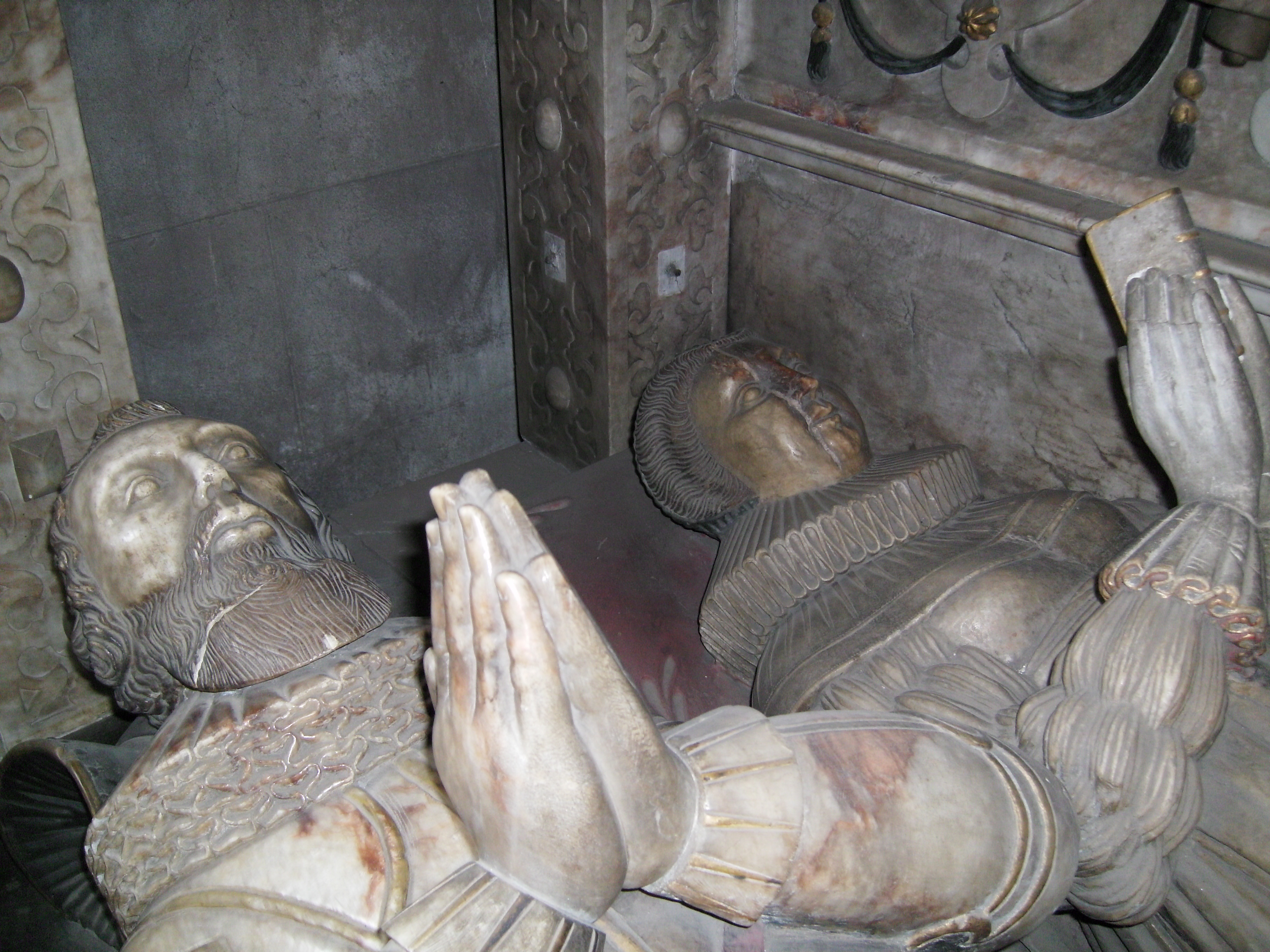
Tomb of Sir Edward Littleton (d. 1610) and Margaret Devereux, St Michael's church, Penkridge, England

=== Cadaver monuments ===
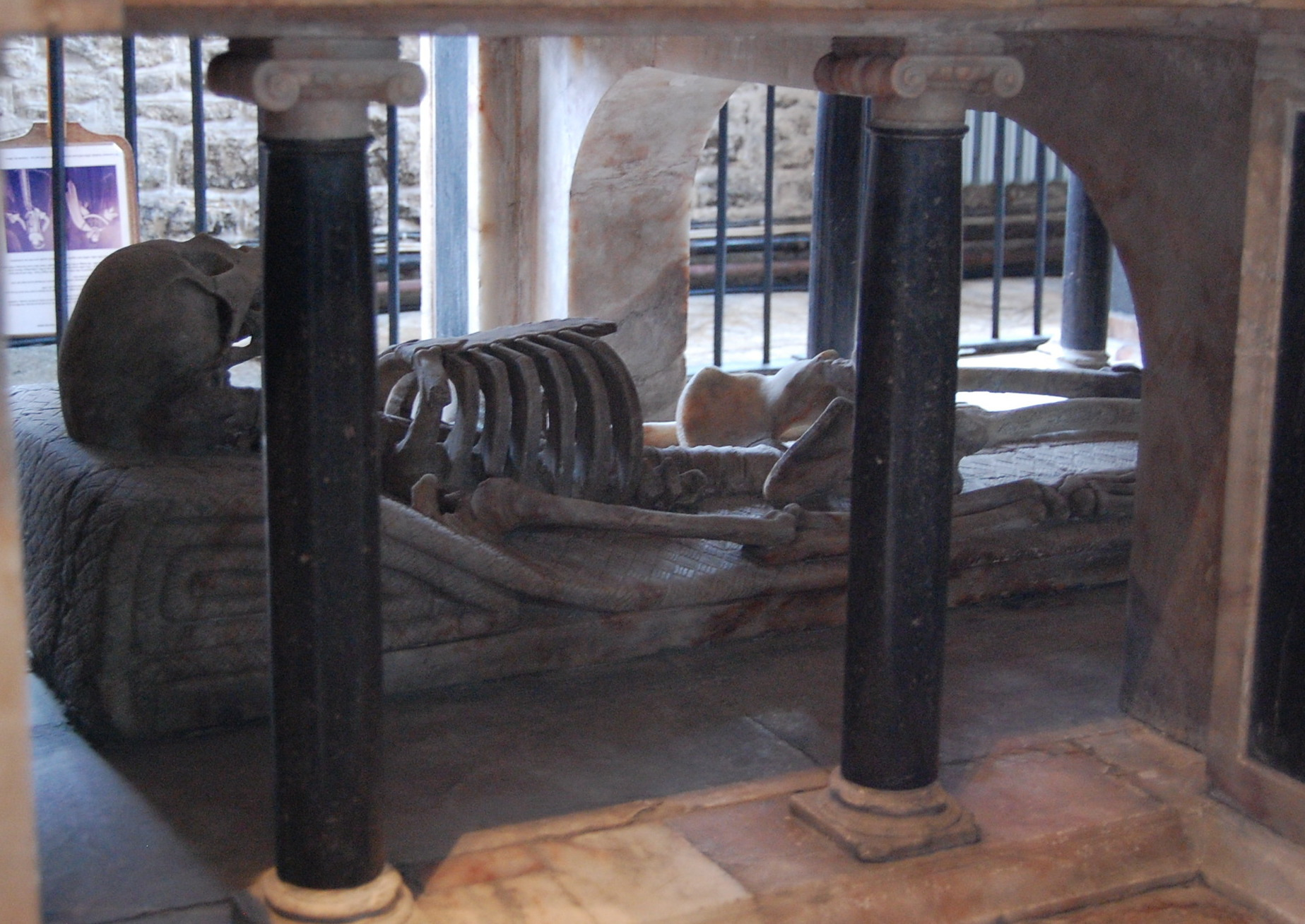
Transi at the Church of St John the Baptist, Burford, Oxfordshire, England

The practice of showing the deceased as a decomposing corpse began in France in the late 14th century and soon spread across Northern Europe. Known as cadaver monuments (French: Transi), (Note: The word Transi is derived from the Latin verb transire ("to go": ire, "across": trans), which in its abbreviated form means to "pass away".) these effigies show the deceased as an emaciated corpse, usually with closed eyes, wearing a shroud or naked (but with their hands arranged to preserve modesty). The format is in stark contrast to gisants, which are always in full dress, with open eyes and often with hands clasped and raised in prayer. The best-known examples were produced by members of the first rank of contemporary sculptors, including Conrad Meit (d. c. 1550). A variation known as demigisant or gisant accounde ("lying on his shoulder") shows the figure lying on its side, held up by its elbows in the Etruscan style while awaiting death, while the mourant assiste type shows the deceased alive but alone, lying on their back.

Cadaver monuments first appeared in the 1380s and remained popular for 200 years. Usually intended as a form of memento mori, they show the human body's transition from life to decomposition, highlighting the contrast between worldly riches and elegance and the degradation of death. A c. 1435–1440 illuminated miniature of a Lady in a Tomb from "The Dawnce of Makabre" folios in the Additional manuscript 37049 (now in the British Library) shows the tiered (double or "two-body") tomb of a fashionable English lady, with her shown in life above the slab, and as a decayed corpse within the tomb chest. The verse below the illustration reads: "Take hede un to my fygure here abowne, And se how sumtyme I was fresche and gay, Now turned to wormes mete and corrupcoun, Bot fowle erthe and stynkyng slyme and clay". However, the art historian Kathleen Cohen notes some important differences to memento mori, primarily that Transi represent specific deceased individuals, and not death itself.

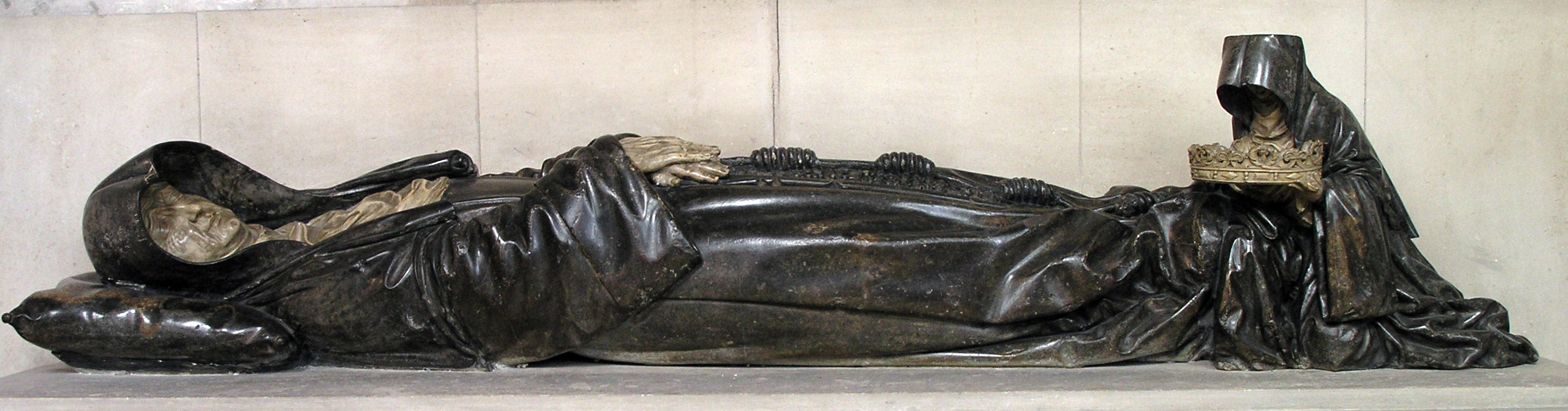
Effigy of Philippa of Guelders (d. 1547). Convent of Pont-à-Mousson, France

Cadaver monuments were a dramatic change from the typical practice of depicting the deceased either in life or in a more idealised form. The impulse toward graphic expression of mortality in part reflects the societal shock and trauma following the Black Death, which hit Europe in 1346 and killed up to half of the population of Eurasia in the next four years. Its aftermath saw, in 15th- and 16th-century literature, painting, manuscript illustration and sculpture, a pronounced emphasis on the macabre and memento mori, indicating a pre-occupation with the brevity and fragility of human life.

In her (incomplete but representative) 1973 survey of extant cadaver monuments, Cohen lists 200 examples, of which 82 are English (produced between 1424–1689), 61 are French (produced 1391–1613), 36 are German (1456–1594), and 20 are in the Lowlands (1387–1645). Considerable differences in style developed across regions and time. The early examples show the deceased either covered in a shroud (popular in France, Burgundy and England), as a shrivelled corpse with tightly pulled skin (especially popular in England), or a decomposing body covered by frogs and snakes (Germany and Austria). The practice of showing the body crawling with worms became popular in France.

Over the centuries, the depictions became more realistic and gruesome, while the early tendency to line the tombs with moralising inscriptions on the vanities of life was abandoned. The convention reached a peak in the late 16th century, with the more extreme effigies depicting putrefied corpses outside of the funerary monument context, and taking centre stage as stand-alone sculptures.

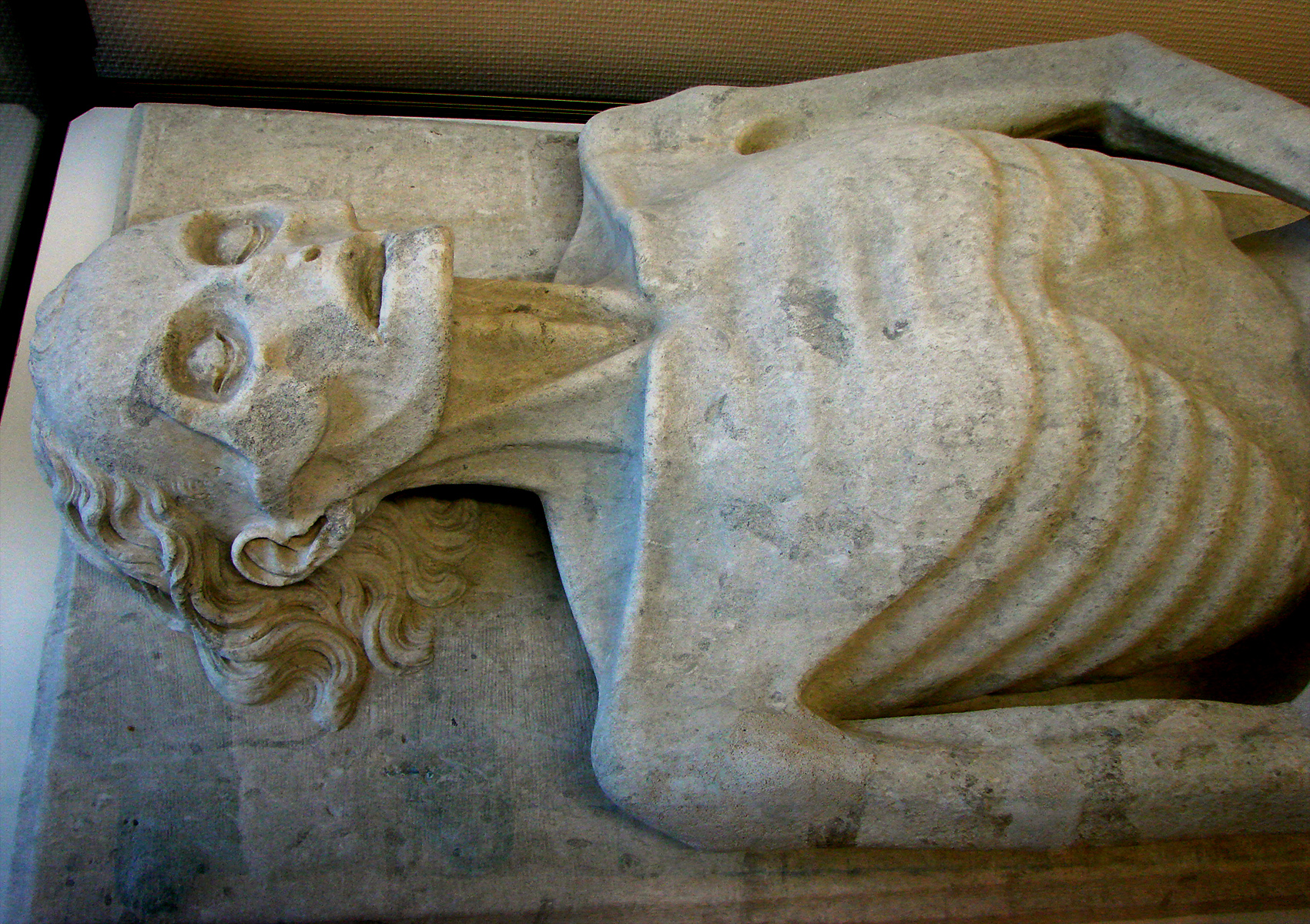
Cadaver Tomb of Guillaume de Harsigny, c. 1394. Musée d'art et d'archéologie de Laon, France.

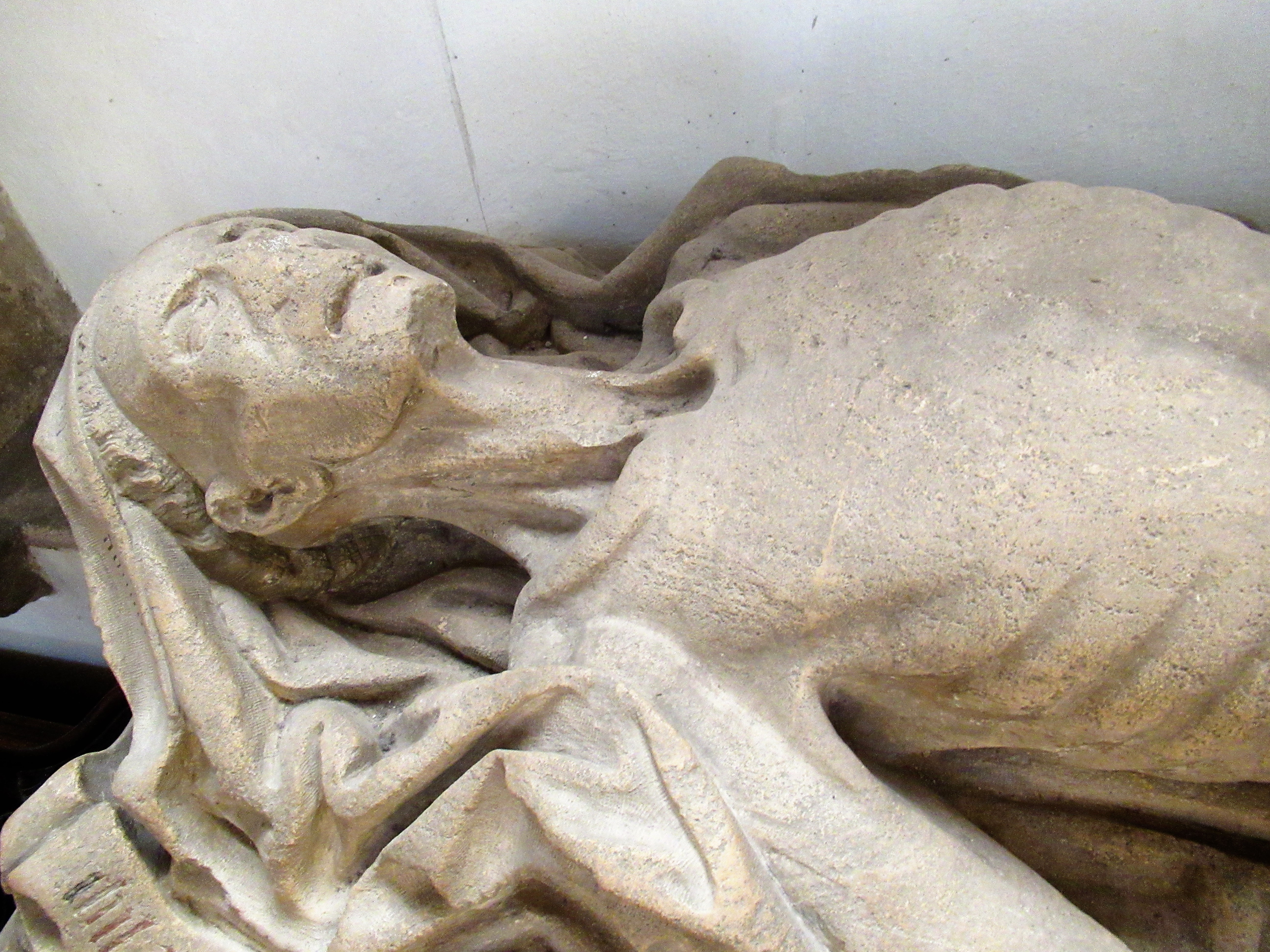
Tomb of John Baret (d 1467), St Mary's Church, Bury St Edmunds, England

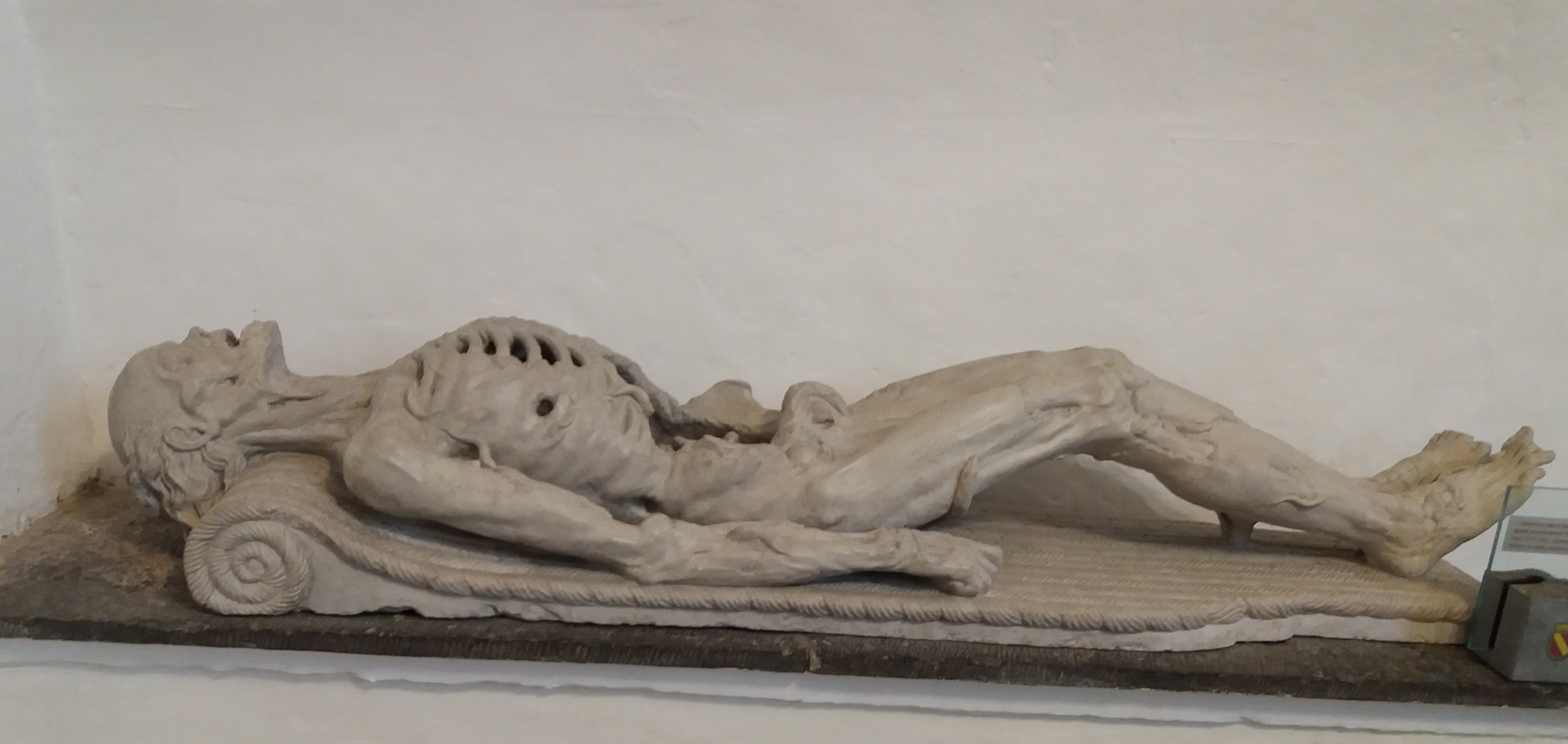
Effigy in the mausoleum of the Lords of Boussu, Boussu Castle, Belgium

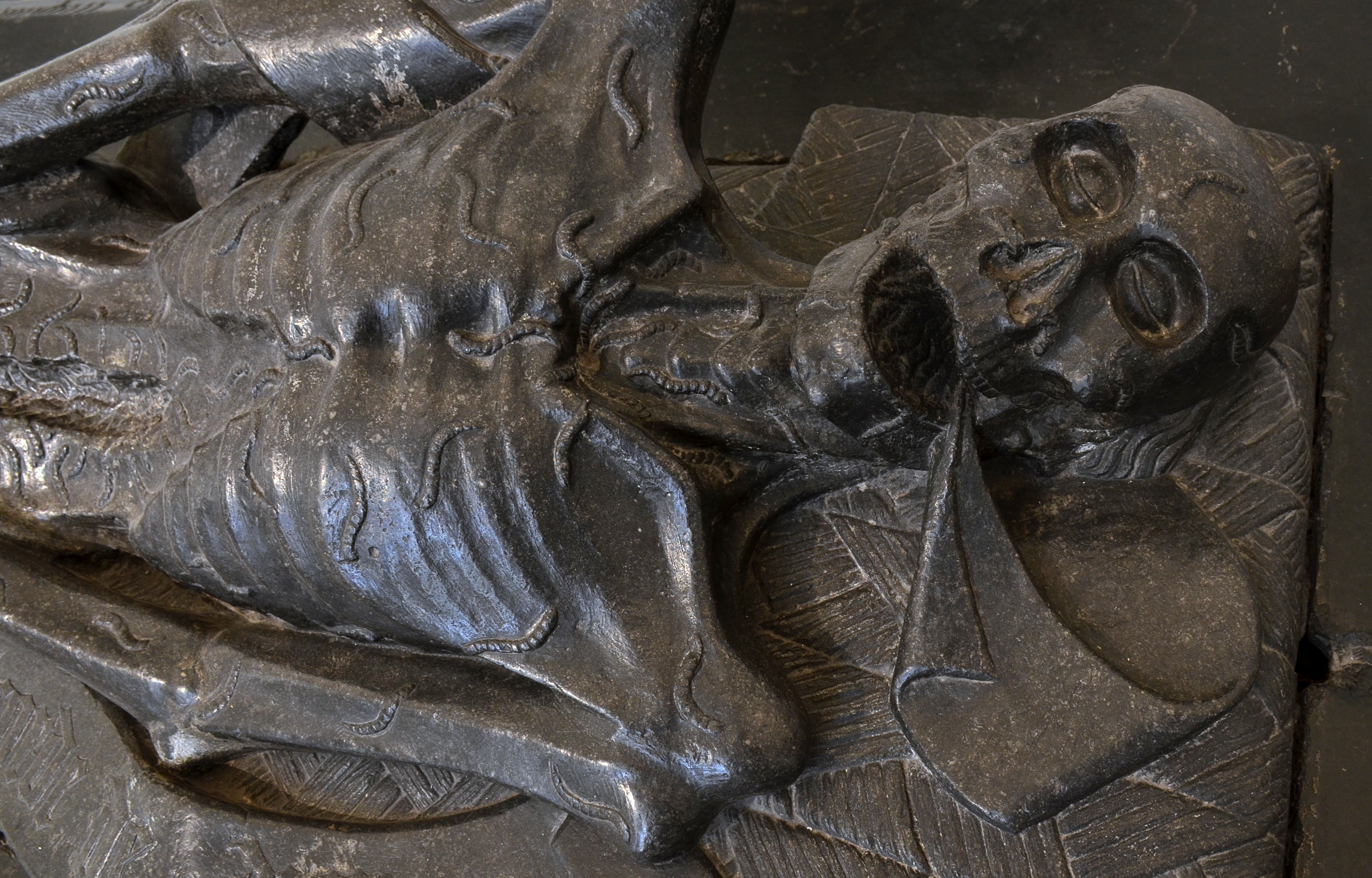
Transi of Guillaume Lefranchois, 1446, Musée des beaux-arts d'Arras, France

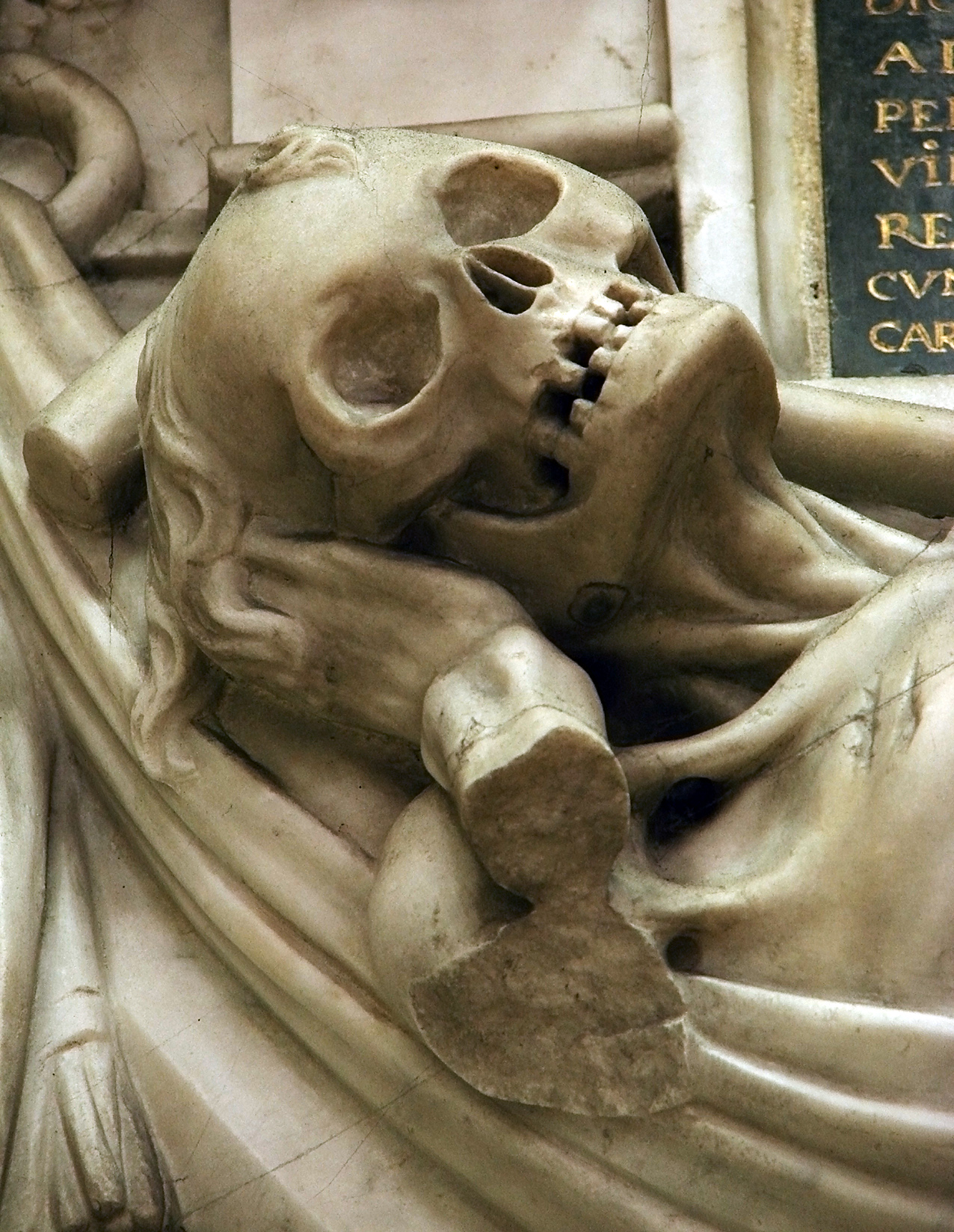
Monument for Jean de Sachy (d. 1662), Amiens Cathedral, France

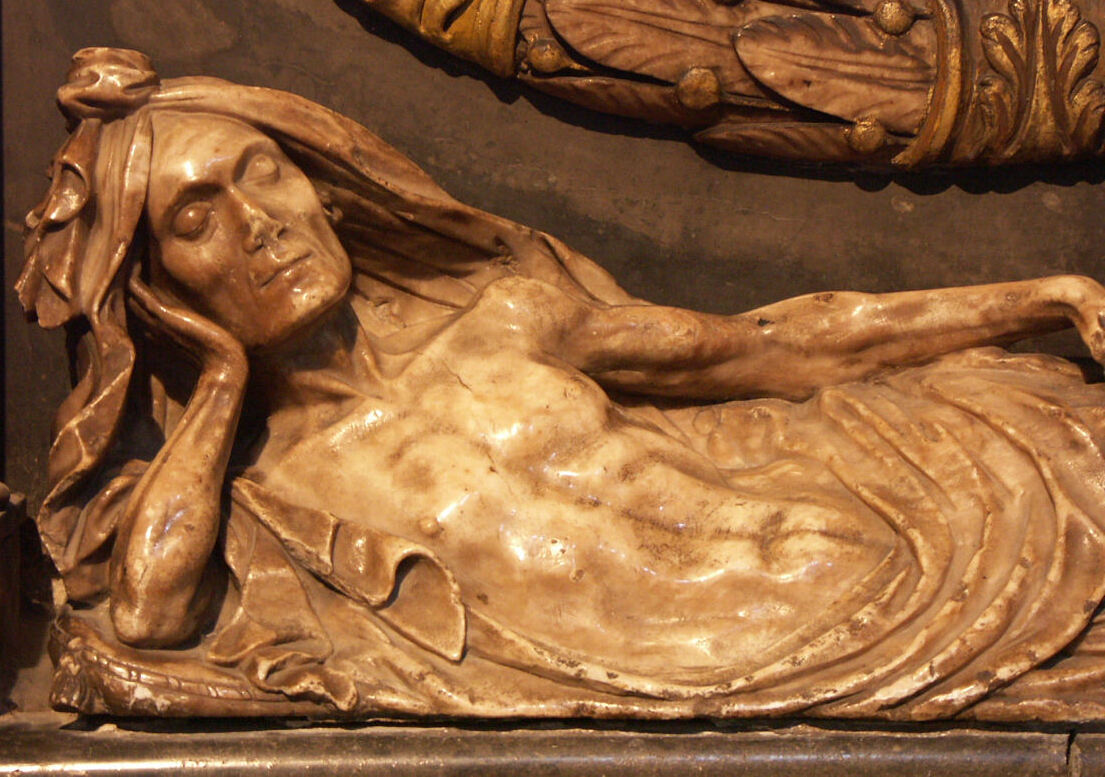
Worcester Cathedral, England

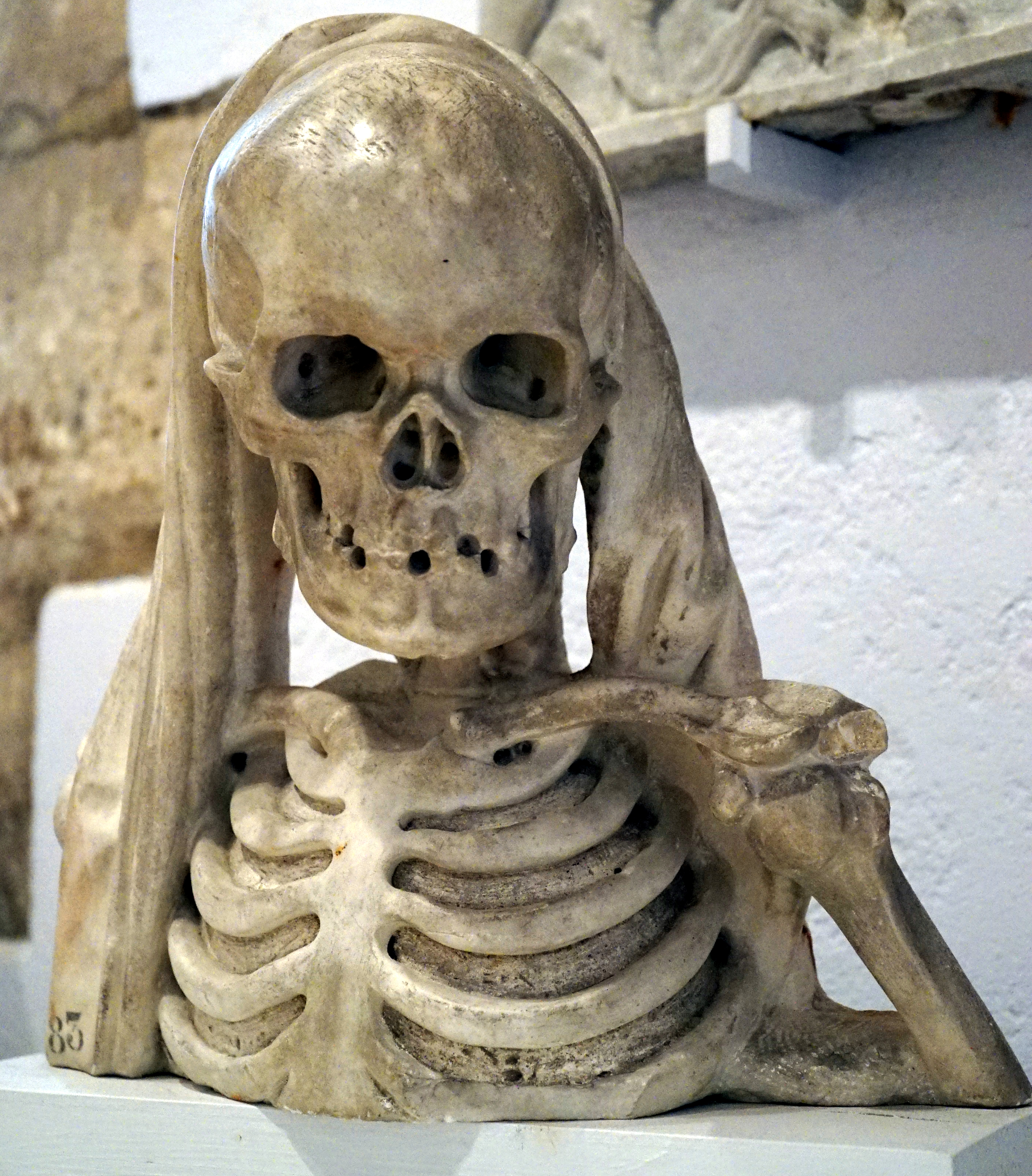
Tomb of Nicolas de L'Hospital (d. 1664). Musée d'Art et d'Histoire de Chaumont, France

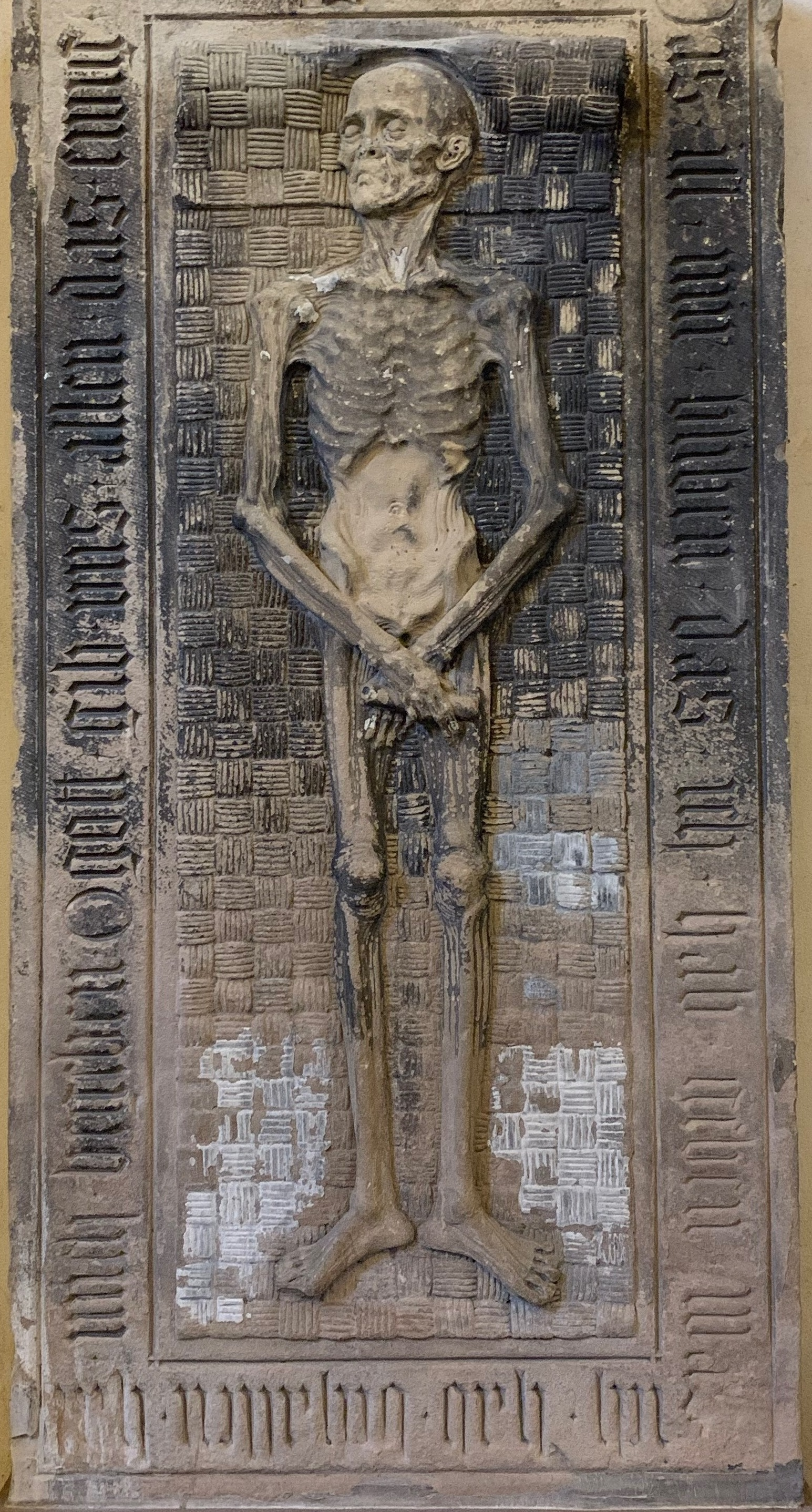
Gravestone of Nicolas Roeder (d. 1890), Strasbourg, France

== Historiography ==
Art-historical studies of tomb sculpture and sepulchral iconography tend to focus on case studies of single examples or regional groups rather than on a broad overview of the type's origins, development and sociological contexts. The main hindrance is the wide interdisciplinary nature required when writing broadly about the area. As Barker points out, comprehensive and authoritative knowledge of such a large topic would necessitate "trespass[ing] on the preserves of archaeology, Egyptology, theology, the history of religion and superstition, philology, and many other [disciplines]". A further practical difficulty is that the many surviving examples are dispersed in churches, abbeys and cathedrals across a large temporal and geographical span, making comprehensive field research especially difficult.

In 1954, Henriette s' Jacob published "Idealism and Realism: A Study of Sepulchral Symbolism", which focused on the various iconographical aspects of tomb imagery. This was followed in 1964 by Panofsky's influential monograph Tomb Sculpture: Its Changing Aspects from Ancient Egypt to Bernini which was based on four lectures he had given and was the broadest and most comprehensive survey to date of European funerary art. Panofsky acknowledged the challenge of scope in his introduction, admitting his reserve on impinging on the "preserves of many adjacent disciplines" in which he is not expert. Although broader than any earlier publications on the topic, the lectures often stray into descriptions of specific works and its scope ends in the 17th century. In a very positive contemporary review, the art historian Jan Białostocki praises Panofsky's lectures as a breakthrough but clarifies that its "treatment of the subject is synthetic and that only the most general outlines of tomb sculpture's development, both in the field of iconography and style, are given." The art historian Susie Nash noted in her 2016 article "Fifty Years Since Panofsky’s 'Tomb Sculpture'" that the topic was at the time so understudied that the reader can discern Panofsky "attempting to codify funerary imagery by formulating its terminology". She credits him with introducing many new terms (usually in French) into the discourse including the "enfeu", "Arts Bereft" and "activation of the effigy". He described double-decker cadaver tombs as tombeaux de grande cérémonie, and originated the term demi-gisants to describe effigies that show the deceased sitting up and supported by their elbows.

The most influential publications following Panofsky's survey are mostly in German and include Kurt Bauch's Das mittelalterliche Grabbild: figürliche Grabmäler des 11. bis 15. Jahrhunderts in Europa (1976) and Hans Körner's Grabmonumente des Mittelalters (1996). Nigel Llewellyn's The state of play: Reflections on the state of research into church monuments discusses the difficulties in providing a full and contextualised history of English tomb art. Writing in 2023, the art historian Joan Holladay noted that the literature on tomb art had "exploded" in the previous quarter century. She categorised publications into five main types; the first two being those surveying many examples from a given region or that are connected stylistically. Thirdly, she mentions publications that detail the sources of particular iconographical elements. The fourth type are those that categorise tombs into particular typologies, while finally and more rarely, are the books and papers giving broad and sweeping overviews.

== Sources ==
- Adams, Ann; Barker, Jessica (eds). Revisiting The Monument: Fifty Years since Panofsky’s Tomb Sculpture Archived 2025-03-29 at the Wayback Machine. London: Courtauld Institute of Art, 2016. ISBN 978-1-9074-850-6-0
- Antoine, Elisabeth. Art from the Court of Burgundy: The Patronage of Philip the Bold and John the Fearless, 1364-1419. Seattle (WA): University of Washington, 2005. ISBN 978-2-7118-4864-5
- Badham, Sally. "Book Review: Jessica Barker, Stone Fidelity, Marriage and Emotion in Medieval Tomb Sculpture". Journal of Medieval Art and Architecture Medieval Art and Architecture, volume 7, issue 3, 2021
- Barker, Jessica. Stone Fidelity: Marriage and Emotion in Medieval Tomb Sculpture. London: Boydell Press, 2020. ISBN 978-1-7832-7271-6
- Bass, Marisa Anne. "The transi tomb and the genius of sixteenth century Netherlandish funerary sculpture". Netherlands Yearbook for the History of Art, volume 67, 2017. JSTOR 26593102
- Białostocki, Jan. "Reviewed Work: Tomb Sculpture by Erwin Panofsky". The Art Bulletin, volume 49, number 3, September 1967. JSTOR 3048476
- Binski, Paul. Medieval Death: Ritual and Representation. London: British Museum Press, 2001. ISBN 978-0-7141-0561-1
- Cohen, Kathleen. Metamorphosis of a Death Symbol: The Transi Tomb in the Late Middle Ages and the Renaissance. Los Angeles: University of California Press, 1973. ISBN 978-0-5200-1844-0
- Cohen, Kathleen. The Changing Meaning of the Transi Tomb in Fifteenth and Sixteenth-Century Europe. Berkeley and Los Angeles (CA): University of California Press, 1968
- Covi, Dario. "Reviewed Work(s): Metamorphosis of a Death Symbol: The Transi Tomb in the Late Middle Ages and the Renaissance. by Kathleen Cohen". Renaissance Quarterly, volume 28, number 3, Autumn 1975. JSTOR 2859829
- Crossley, Frederick Herbert. English church monuments A. D. 1150-1550. London: B.T. Batsford, 1921
- Dobson, Aidan. British Royal Tombs. London: Pallas Athene, 2018. ISBN 978-1-8436-8118-2
- Draper, James David. Playing With Fire: European Terracottas, 1740-1840 Archived 2024-04-05 at the Wayback Machine. NY: Metropolitan Museum of Art, 2004. Retrieved 5 July 2024
- Dressler, Rachel. "Cross-legged Knights and Signification in English Medieval Tomb Sculpture". Studies in Iconography, volume 21, 2000. JSTOR 23924216
- Fozi, Shirin. Romanesque Tomb Effigies: Death and Redemption in Medieval Europe, 1000–1200. University Park (PA): Penn State University Press, 2021. ISBN 978-0-2710-8917-1
- Fozi, Shirin. "Reinhildis Has Died": Ascension and Enlivenment on a Twelfth-Century Tomb. Speculum, volume 90, number 1, January 2015. JSTOR 43577275
- Fryer, Alfred Cooper. "Wooden Monumental Effigies In England And Wales". London: Archaeologia or Miscellaneous Tracts relating to Antiquity, 1909, republished 1924
- Harris, O. D. "Antiquarian attitudes: crossed legs, crusaders and the evolution of an idea". The Antiquaries Journal, volume 90, 2010
- Hebblethwaite, Rob. "The Good, the Bad and the Rotten: How the Living Dealt With the Dead in England c.600-1200". PhD thesis, University of East Anglia, 2017
- Heimerman, Emily. "A Portrait of Death: Analyzing the Transi Tomb of Guillaume de Harcigny (1300-1393 A.D.) Archived 2023-05-24 at the Wayback Machine". Coalition of Master’s Scholars on Material Culture, April 2, 2021
- Holladay, Joan. "Tombs and Memory: Some Recent Books". Speculum, volume 78, nr 28, 2003. pp. 440–450
- s'Jacob, Henriette. Idealism and Realism: A Study of Sepulchral Symbolism. University of Michigan: E.J. Brill, 1954
- Jugie, Sophie. Le Tombeau de Philippe Pot. Paris: Ediciones El Viso, 2019. ISBN 978-8-4948-2447-0
- Jugie, Sophie. The Mourners: Tomb Sculpture from the Court of Burgundy. New Haven (CT): Yale University Press, 2010. ISBN 978-0-3001-5517-4
- Lindsay, Suzanne Glover. "Mummies and Tombs: Turenne, Napoléon, and Death Ritual". The Art Bulletin, volume 82, number 3, September 2000. JSTOR 3051398
- Lindsay, Suzanne Glover. Funerary Arts and Tomb Cult: Living with the Dead in France, 1750–1870. Farnham: Ashgate, 2012. ISBN 978-1-4094-2261-7
- Panofsky, Erwin. Tomb Sculpture: Four Lectures on its Changing Aspects from Ancient Egypt to Bernini. London: Harry Abrams, 1964. ISBN 978-0-8109-3870-0
- Palozzi. Luca. "Petrarch and Memorial Art: Blurring the borders between art theory and art practice in Trecento Italy". In: Adams, Ann; Barker, Jessica (eds). Revisiting The Monument: Fifty Years since Panofsky’s Tomb Sculpture Archived 2025-03-29 at the Wayback Machine. London: Courtauld Institute of Art, 2016. ISBN 978-1-9074-850-6-0
- Pevsner, Nikolaus. L'Europe Gothique XIIe XIVe siècles. Paris: Louvre and the French Ministry of Culture, 1968
- Oosterwijk, Sophie; Badham, Sally. "Relief copper alloy tombs in medieval Europe: image, identity and reception". In: Thomas, Nicolas; Dandridge, Pete (eds.) Medieval Copper, Bronze and Brass: history, archaeology and archaeometry of the production of brass, bronze and other copper alloy objects in medieval Europe (12th–16th centuries). Namur, Institut du Patrimoine Wallon, 2018. ISBN 978-2-3903-8016-0
- Oosterwijk, Sophie. "Precious-metal effigial tomb monuments in medieval Europe 1080-1430". Academia.edu, 2014
- Ramage, Nancy; Ramage, Andrew. Roman Art: Romulus to Constantine. NJ: Pearson Prentice-Hall, 2009
- Roe, Helen. "Cadaver Effigial Monuments in Ireland". Journal of the Royal Society of Antiquaries of Ireland, volume 99, number 1, 1969. p. 4. JSTOR 25509699
- Rushforth, G. McN. Funeral Lights in Roman Sepulchral Monuments. Journal of Roman Studies, volume 5, 1915. JSTOR 296303
- Smith, Jeffrey Chipps. The Northern Renaissance. London: Phaidon Press, 2004. ISBN 978-0714838670
- Stone, Lawrence. Sculpture in Britain: The Middle Ages. London: Penguin Books, 1972. ISBN 978-0-3000-5300-5
- Tummers, H.A. "The medieval effigial tombs in Chichester Cathedral". Church Monuments, volume 3, 1988
- Tummers, H.A. Early Secular Effigies in England: The Thirteenth Century Archived 2023-04-16 at the Wayback Machine. Leiden: Brill Archive, 1980. ISBN 978-9-0040-6255-9
- Turfa, Jean Macintosh. Catalogue of the Etruscan Gallery of the University of Pennsylvania Museum of Archaeology and Anthropology. Philadelphia (PA): University of Pennsylvania Press, 2005. ISBN 978-1-9317-0752-7
- Welch, Christina. "Depicting Death in Late-medieval British funerary sculpture; English and Welsh carved cadavers, c1420/5-1588 Archived 2023-06-22 at the Wayback Machine". Mourning & Morbidity: British Death and Art, University of York, 10 March 2015
- Welch, Christina. "For Prayers and Pedagogy: Contextualising English Carved Cadaver Monuments of the Late-Medieval Social and Religious Elite". Fieldwork in Religion, Equinox Publishing, 2012
