= Mattoon =

Mattoon may refer to:

== Places ==
- Mattoon, Illinois
  - Mattoon station, Illinois
- Mattoon, Kentucky
- Mattoon, Wisconsin

== People ==
- Abner C. Mattoon (1814–1895), New York politician
- Laura I. Mattoon (1873-1946), American camp director
