= Eli Harvey =

American sculptor and painter

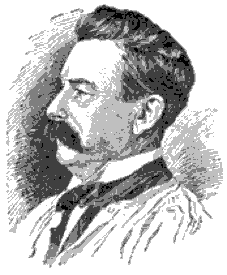
- Born: September 23, 1860; Ogden, Ohio
- Died: February 10, 1957 (aged 96); Alhambra, California
- Education: Art Academy of Cincinnati
- Occupations: Sculptor, painter, and animalier

Eli Harvey (September 23, 1860 – February 10, 1957) was an American sculptor, painter and animalier.

== Biography ==
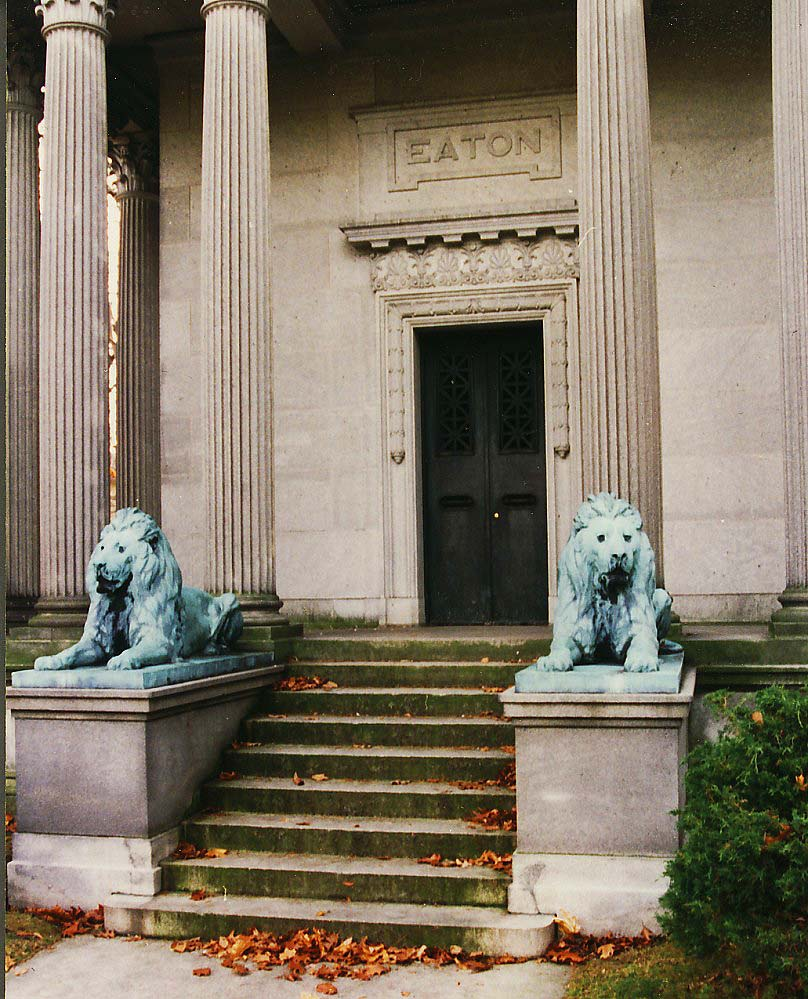
The Eaton family's mausoleum at Mount Pleasant Cemetery in Toronto, with lions by Eli Harvey

Harvey was born in Ogden, Ohio, a Quaker community in Clinton County, to William P. and Nancy M. Harvey. He attended art school in the Art Academy of Cincinnati where he studied painting with Thomas Satterwhite Noble and sculpture with Louis Rebisso. In 1889 he moved to Paris where he continued his studies, with Lefebvre, Constant, Doucet and finally Frémiet. In 1897 he began exhibiting sculptures of animals at Paris salons and continued doing so until returning to the United States in 1900, by which time he was "firmly committed to animal sculpture."

His work was exhibited at both the Pan-American Exposition (Buffalo, New York, 1900) and at the Louisiana Purchase Exposition (Saint Louis, Missouri, 1904) and a decade later at the Panama–Pacific International Exposition (San Francisco, California, 1915). Harvey also produced architectural sculpture for the lion house at the New York Zoological Park and two lions for the Eaton family mausoleum in Toronto, Ontario, Canada.

Harvey's most popular work was a life-sized elk produced for the Benevolent and Protective Order of Elks and used at their buildings and in cemeteries around the United States.

He died in Alhambra, California on February 10, 1957.

His home is included on the National Register of Historic Places listings in Clinton County, Ohio.

== Elk, or Elk at Rest ==
"The Order of Elks commissioned him to create a statue of the elk. and so pleased were they with the result that they ordered numerous replicas to be made." These include the following:

Elks statues by Eli Harvey
Year	Location	Image
1904	Greenwood Cemetery, New Orleans, Louisiana	
1904	Evergreen Cemetery, Colorado Springs, Colorado	
1905	North Burial Ground, Providence, Rhode Island	
1907	Clinton County Historical Society, 149 East Locust Street, Wilmington, Ohio	
1907	318 Prince Street, over entrance, Alexandria, Virginia	
1909	Riverside Cemetery, Waterbury, Connecticut	
Between; 1904 & 1915	Elks Opera House, Prescott, Arizona	
1917	Lakewood Cemetery, Minneapolis, Minnesota	Elk by Eli Harvey in Minneapolis cemetery
1923	Mohawk Trail, Florida, Massachusetts	
1924	B.P.O. E., Route 11 South, Kirkwood, New York	
1925	Toledo Memorial Park, Sylvania, Ohio	
1925	Oakwood Cemetery, Syracuse, New York	
1936	Woodlawn National Cemetery, Elmira, New York	
1937	Elks National Home, Bedford, Virginia	
	Highland Lawn Cemetery, Terre Haute, Indiana	ELK by Eli Harvey in Terre Haute, Indiana, USA
	Greenlawn Cemetery Newport News, Virginia	
	Kensico Cemetery, Valhalla, New York	
	Roselawn Cametery, Pueblo, Colorado	

== Work ==
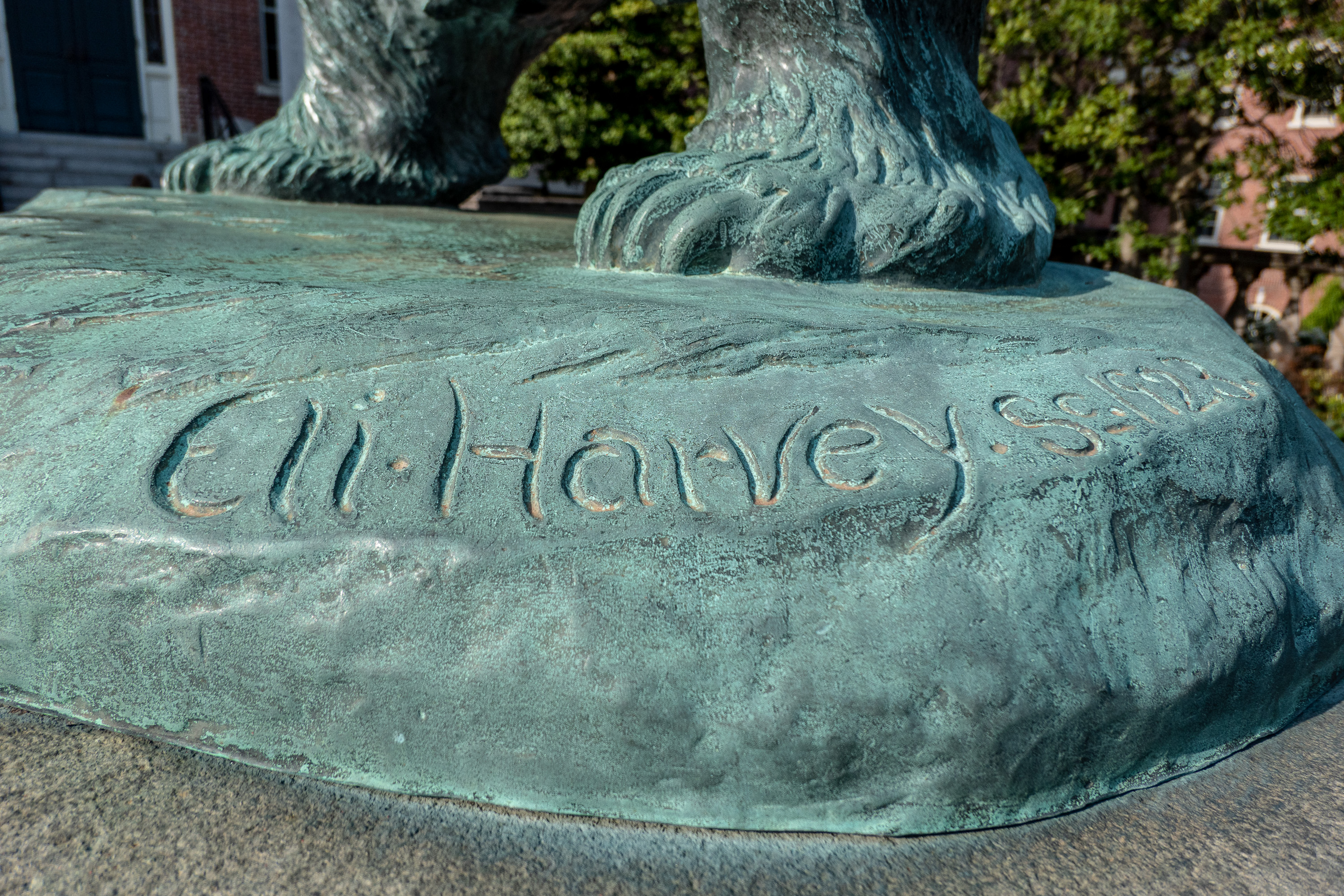
Eli Harvey's signature adorns "Bronze Bruno" at Brown University (1927)

Harvey's works can be found in :

- The Harmon Museum, Lebanon, Ohio.
- Clinton County History Center, Wilmington, Ohio
- Cranbrook Academy of Art Museum
- Los Angeles County Museum of Art
- Museum of Fine Arts, St. Petersburg, Florida
- R. W. Norton Art Gallery, Shreveport, Louisiana
- Cincinnati Art Museum, Cincinnati, Ohio
- Brookgreen Gardens, Murrells Inlet, South Carolina
- Metropolitan Museum of Art, New York City
- Eaton Mausoleum, Toronto, Canada
- Bronx Zoo, Bronx, New York
- Brown University, Providence, Rhode Island
- St. Louis Art Museum, St. Louis, Missouri
- Natural History Museum of Los Angeles County, Los Angeles
- Benevolent and Protective Order of Elks, Alexandria, Virginia
- Smithsonian American Art Museum, Washington, District of Columbia
- Chester County History Center, West Chester, Pennsylvania
- Westmoreland Museum of American Art, Greensburg, Pennsylvania
- Benevolent and Protective Order of Elks, Kirkwood, New York
- National Cowboy & Western Heritage Museum, Oklahoma City, Oklahoma
- Denver Art Museum, Denver, Colorado
- Buffalo Bill Historical Center, Cody, Wyoming
- Newark Museum, Newark, New Jersey
- Bridgemarket, New York City
