= Ethel Mars =

Ethel Mars may refer to:

- Ethel Mars (artist) (1884–1959), American woodblock printmaker
- Ethel V. Mars (1884–1945), American businesswoman and racehorse owner
