= John Ellsworth Weis =

American painter (1892–1962)

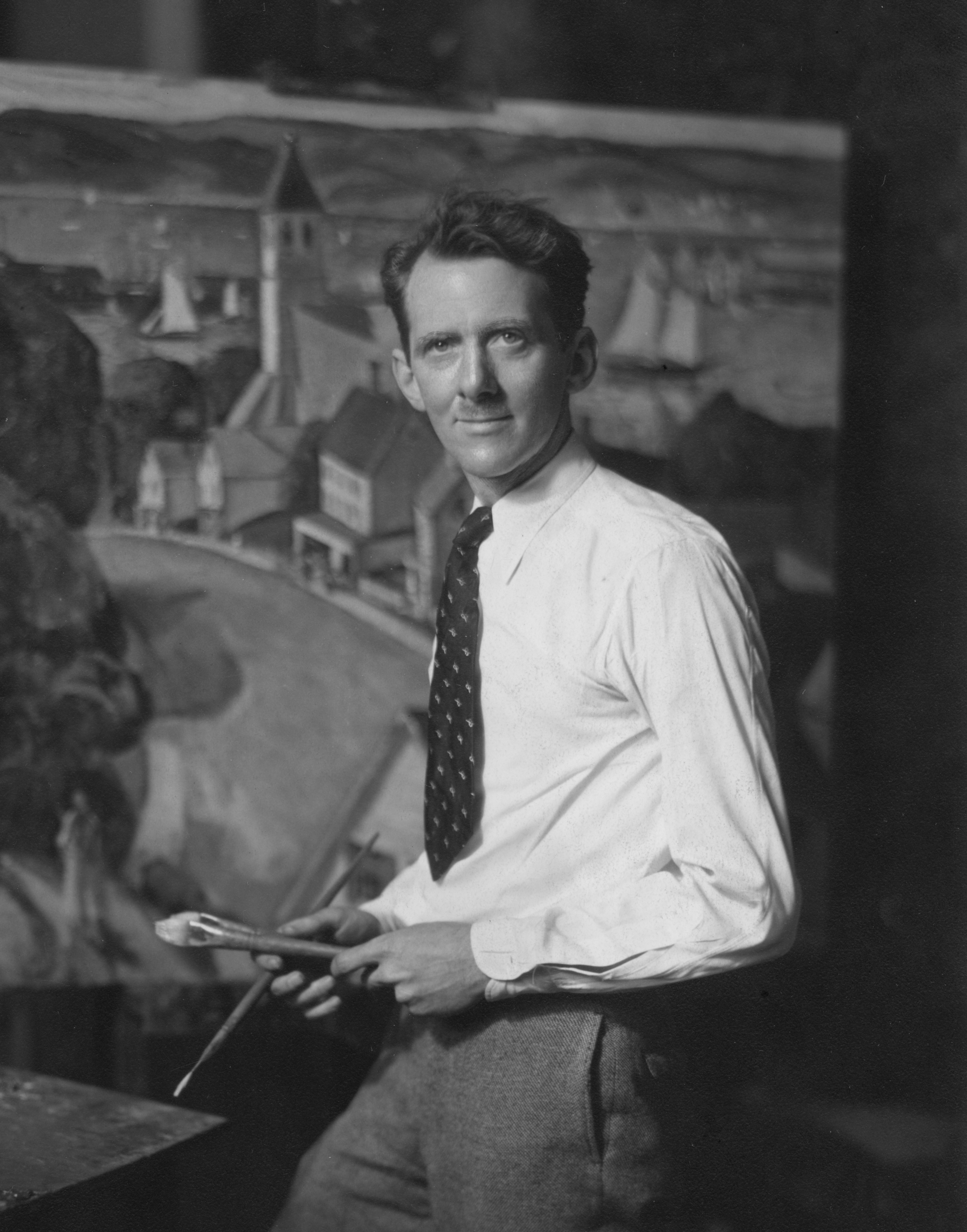
John Ellsworth Weis, circa 1930s

The Canal at Dusk, oil painting by John Ellsworth Weis

John Ellsworth Weis (1892–1962) was an American painter.

== Biography ==
He was born in Powell County, Kentucky, moved to Higginsport, Ohio at an early age, and then moved again to Norwood, Ohio, at nine years of age. At 14 years of age, he enrolled in night classes at the Art Academy of Cincinnati, the faculty of which included Frank Duveneck (1848–1919), James Roy Hopkins (1877–1969), Lewis Henry Meakin (1850–1917), and Herman Henry Wessel (1878–1969). Weis eventually became a full-time student, and at age 22, joined the faculty. He remained on the faculty for 38 years, with the exception of a period of military service during World War I.

In the 1920s Weis traveled to Europe, where he exhibited at the Paris Salon. He was accompanied by his student, Frank Harmon Myers (1899–1956) on this trip. After returning to Cincinnati, Weis married Sally Cuthbert, a student at the Art Academy of Cincinnati who became an instructor at the University of Cincinnati College of Design, Architecture, Art, and Planning. Parkinson's disease forced him to retire from the Art Academy in 1957, and he died from a fall in his home in 1962.

Weis is best known for his impressionistic landscapes (as typified by The Canal at Dusk) and portraits (as typified by An Afro-American with Hat). He exhibited at the Pennsylvania Academy of the Fine Arts Annual in 1925, 1926, 1927, 1930, and 1933; at the Art Institute of Chicago in 1926, 1928, and 1930; and at the Corcoran Gallery biennials in 1928 and 1932.

He died in 1962.

== Auction record ==
The auction record for a painting by John Ellsworth Weis is $3,105. This record was set by The Canal at Dusk, a 12 by 17 inch oil painting on canvas sold January 7, 2007.
