= Noel Martin (disambiguation) =

Noel or Noël Martin may refer to:

- Noël Martin (1959–2020), British assisted suicide activist
- Noel Martin (1922–2009), American graphic designer
- Noel Martin (British Army officer) (1892–1985), British Army officer
