= De La Salle Institute (Manhattan) =

Location
- Manhattan; New York City, New York; US; 40.76279°N 73.96952°W

Information
- Type: Private,
- Religious affiliation: Roman Catholic
- Grades: 9-12

The De La Salle Institute was a coed Catholic Church school which operated in Manhattan in New York City beginning in the 19th century. From 1902 it was located at 106 West 59th Street, running through to 107 West 58th Street. It fronted 59th Street for 53.5 feet (16.3 m) and faced Central Park. It had a depth of 200 feet (61 m), with 53 feet (16 m) on West 58th Street, and 71 feet (22 m) west on Sixth Avenue. In August 1912 the De La Salle Institute adjoined the German Club on West 59th Street and the Hotel Savilla on West 58th Street.

== Location changes ==
The property was purchased in February 1921 by a syndicate, incorporated as the Copley Hotel Studios, with plans to build an upscale co-operative apartment house on the Central Park South location. The new building was to be twenty stories high and designed by architect Charles W. Buckham. The apartment corporation was headed by Charles K. Eagle, of the silk firm of J.H. and C.K. Eagle. Eagle owned a twelve-story loft structure on the southeast corner of Fourth Avenue and 21st Street.

In July 1922, the De La Salle Institute relocated to a four-story building at 19 West 75th Street, which cost $45,000. The house stood on a lot measuring 23 by 102.2 feet (7.0 by 31.2 m). It was located between Central Park West and Columbus Avenue.

The then mixed-sex school purchased the Veltin School for Girls property in August 1924. It was a modern fireproof school structure at 160 and 162 West 74th Street. It ran through to 163 and 165 West 73rd Street.

== Notable alumni ==
- Paul Bernard Malone (1872–1960), Army general
- Ted Healy (1896–1937), Comedian
- James H. Fay (1899–1948), U.S. congressman
