= Maurice B. Stein =

American businessman and philanthropist (1936–1994)

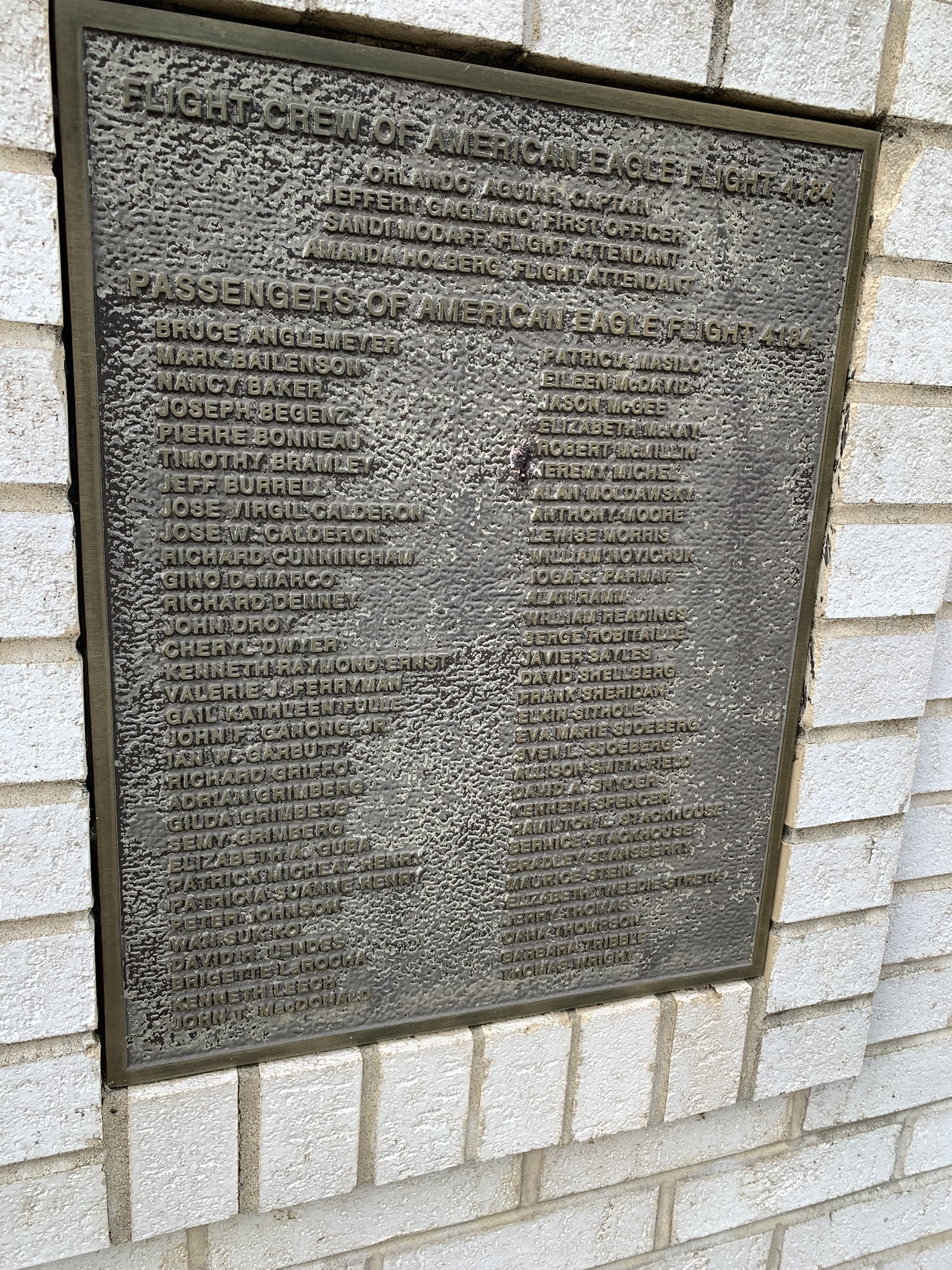
- Memorial Plaque for the victims of American Eagle Flight 4184; Stein's name is 6th up from the bottom right
- Born: April 6, 1936; Bloomsburg, Pennsylvania, U.S.
- Died: October 31, 1994 (aged 58)
- Resting place: Roselawn, Indiana, U.S.
- Education: Brandeis University (1958); University of Chicago (MBA, 1960)
- Organization: Camp Echo Lake
- Spouse: Amy Medine (m. 1958)
- Children: 3

Maurice Berle Stein (April 6, 1936 – October 31, 1994; also known as Morry) was the owner of Camp Echo Lake (New York), a summer camp for mostly grade school students. He was the owner for over 30 years, along with his wife, Amy Medine.

== Early life and formative years ==
Stein was born in 1936 in Bloomsburg, Pennsylvania, to George Stein and Rose (nee Barenblatt), the latter being a Jewish emigrant from Ukraine. He attended Bloomsburg Area High School.

Stein was a 1958 graduate of Brandeis University, and was a member of its football team, the Brandeis Judges. He was originally drafted to the San Francisco 49ers but backed out of the position to pursue further education and received an M.B.A. from the University of Chicago in 1960. He worked several years in business before buying Camp Echo Lake in 1964.

== Camp Echo Lake ==
At the age of 28, Stein bought Camp Echo Lake from his wife's parents, who founded it in 1946. Later, Stein bought over 150 acres (0.61 km^{2}) of land for the camp. Carrying his love of sports with him to his work, he helped establish the Empire State Wrestling School, which ran during the camp. Each year, starting in 1971, he enrolled a few dozen underprivileged children in the camp who would otherwise be unable to attend. In the sixth year of Stein and his wife running the program, the camp was accommodating more than 300 such children.

Stein was a former president of the American Camping Association and its New York section as well as a former president of the New York State Camp Directors Association.

== Death ==
Stein, at the age of 58, died on Monday, October 31, 1994, in the crash of an American Eagle commuter flight 4184 plane near Roselawn, Indiana. At his death, Stein was en route to his home in Hartsdale, New York after working on a fund-raising program for underprivileged children at the American Camping Association in Martinsville, Indiana. He had three sons.

In his honor, the year after his death, his family and friends founded 'Morry's Camp', a free summer camp for poor children, located in the Catskills. It evolved into an annual program, called 'Project Morry'.
