= Isabelle Sprague Smith =

Isabelle Dwight Sprague Smith, 1939, recipient of honorary degree, Rollins College, Winter Park, Florida

Isabelle Sprague Smith, also Isabelle Dwight Sprague Smith (November 11, 1861 – December 28, 1950) was an American artist, teacher, and school principal until the mid-1920s. Her students donated the Isabelle D. Sprague Smith Studio to the MacDowell Colony, where she was a member, by 1918. She was director of the People's Institute of New York. Sprague Smith was president of the Bach Festival in New York, and the founder of the Bach Festival in Winter Park, Florida in 1935.

== Personal life and education ==
Isabelle Dwight was born on November 11, 1861, in Clinton, New York, the daughter of Benjamin W. Dwight and Wealthy J. Dewey Dwight. Her uncle was Theodore William Dwight, the head of Columbia Law School, and her great-grandfather was Timothy Dwight IV, was the president of Yale University and before that was chaplain of General Samuel Holden Parsons's brigade during the Revolutionary War. She attended Dwight School in Clinton, in which her father was the founder and principal, and then studied art at the Art Students League of New York and in Paris.

She married Charles Sprague Smith, a Columbia University professor and a social progressive, on November 11, 1884, in Clinton, New York. They had a daughter, Hilda, on September 18, 1885, and lived at 29 W. 68th Street in Manhattan beginning by 1903. The Sprague Smiths were on the New York Social Register. Charles was seriously ill with pneumonia and died on March 29 or 30 in 1910.

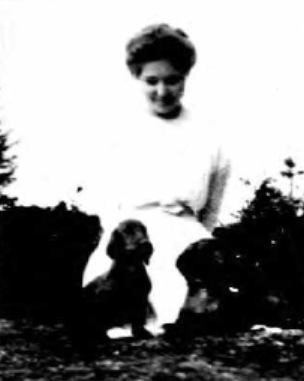
Hilda Sprague Smith, by January 1910, passport photograph

Hilda attended Velton School for Girls. She studied politics, history and economics and graduated from Bryn Mawr College in 1909. (Note: Isabelle and Hilda traveled throughout Europe following the 1909 graduation. Hilda documented her travels to Europe and other family events in 31 scrapbooks and journals that were donated to Berea College in 1942, the year she died.) On November 1, 1915, she married Victor Starzenski, the son of Polish Count Maurice and Countess Anna Starzenski. (Note: She also married him by contract in 1916, because she desired a method where she was not "given away" in marriage. They lived in Schenectady, New York,) where he worked at General Electric as an engineer. She was back to Hilda Sprague Smith in 1929. (Note: Hilda Sprague Smith resided at the family house on W. 68th Street by 1929, when she traveled to Europe with Isabelle and Louise Veltin.)

In 1935, Sprague Smith had a Spanish-style house built for her in Winter Park, Florida, that was designed by James Gamble Rogers II. Hilda died in 1942. Isabelle established the Hilda Sprague-Smith Fund for the purchase of books about history at the Bryn Mawr College Library in her memory. After a brief illness, Sprague Smith died on December 28, 1950.

== Career ==
=== New York ===
Sprague Smith was an art teacher, and the principal of Veltin School for Girls from 1900. to 1925.

She worked as an artist, and had a Carnegie Hall studio by 1903. Sprague Smith was a director of the MacDowell Club and by 1903 was a member of the Woman's Art Club of New York. She was director of Arden Studios at 160 W. 74th Street (the same location as Veltin School) by 1915. She was a member of the MacDowell Colony and by 1918, 31 of Sprague Smith's students funded the creation of the Isabelle D. Sprague Smith studio at the MacDowell Colony, an artist colony in Peterborough, New Hampshire.

She helped found and was director of the People's Institute, which was founded by her husband. He was its director until his death in 1910.

Sprague Smith was a member of the Cosmopolitan Club, a private social club for women, and the Barnard Club. She was president of the New York Bach Festival.

=== Florida ===
She founded the Bach Festival in Winter Park, Florida, in 1935. Through "sheer force of will, [she] created the choir, soloists, musicians, audience and funds necessary for the project." The annual concert has been held the months of February and March at the Knowles Memorial Chapel at Rollins College and beginning in the late 1940s was broadcast over a national broadcasting station.

She received an honorary degree from Rollins College in 1939. She managed the festivals activities until 1950. It is Central Florida's oldest operating performing arts organization and the third-oldest continuously operating Bach Festival in the United States.
