= American Camp Association =

Association for camp owners, camp professionals and others

The American Camp Association (ACA), formerly known as the American Camping Association, is a 501(c)(3) nonprofit that serves the United States. It is an association for camp owners, camp professionals and others interested in summer camps and similar camp programs.

Since 1948, the ACA has offered the only nationwide external professional peer-review accreditation program for camps. According to ACA, to become accredited, camps must meet up to 300 health and safety standards, which are considered best practices throughout the industry. The accreditation process is voluntary, and ACA currently accredits more than 2,500 camps nationwide.

ACA claims a diverse 12,000 plus membership. It has membership types for individuals, camps, and businesses. The American Camp Association has 23 local offices throughout the country. Annual conferences are held across the country by local chapters, in addition to the ACA National Conference.

== History ==
The American Camping Association® (ACA) was founded in 1910 under the original name, Camp Directors Association of America (CDAA). CDAA was founded in 1910 by Alan S. Williams. Founder Alan S. Williams created a model and standardizing influence for the organized camp experience for the young. The CDAA merged with the National Association of Directors of Girls' Camps in 1924 and changed its name to the Camp Director Association (CDA). In 1935, the name was changed to the American Camping Association, Incorporated (ACA). This name would stay the same until 2004, when it was changed to the American Camp Association®.

The Gunnery Camp is considered the first organized American camp. Frederick W. Gunn and his wife Abigail operated a home school for boys in Washington, Connecticut. In 1861, they took the whole school on a two-week trip. The class hiked to their destination and then set up camp. The students spent their time boating, fishing, and trapping. The trip was so successful, the Gunns continued the tradition for twelve years.

== Leadership ==
Governed by a board of directors, the organization's mission is advanced through a partnership with governance volunteers, staff, and grass-roots volunteers located throughout local offices.

=== Chief Executive Officer ===
- Maurice B. Stein, former president
- Henry DeHart, current CEO

== See also ==
- Laura I. Mattoon
