= Marie Bruner Haines =

American artist

Marie Bruner Haines (November 16, 1885 – August 27, 1979) was an American painter, muralist, illustrator, and teacher. She also went by the married name of Marie Bruner Haines Burt.

== Biography ==
Marie Bruner Haines was born on November 16, 1885, in Cincinnati, Ohio, to parents Olive C. Bruner, and Rev. Charles Henry Haines. She was a graduate of Madisonville High School in Madisonville neighborhood of Cincinnati, Ohio. She was married to Frederick A. Burt in 1950.

Haines studied art at the Art Academy of Cincinnati from 1900 to 1901, at the Pennsylvania Academy of the Fine Arts, in Philadelphia from 1904 to 1905. She moved to Atlanta, Georgia before returning to studies in 1915 in New York City at the Art Students League of New York with Noble Volk, Francis Coates Jones, Frank DuMond, and Dimitri Romanofsky.

She was a member of the Southern States Art League and the Texas Fine Arts Association. She was based in College Station, Texas for many years.

Haines died on August 27, 1979, in Bennington, Vermont, and was buried at Park Lawn Cemetery in Bennington, Vermont.

== Selected works ==
- Murals, Cushing Library, Texas A&M
- Gesso panels, Museum of New Mexico, Santa Fe, New Mexico
- Theater decorations, Bryan, Texas
