= Chiwoniso Kaitano =

Zimbabwe-born lawyer and arts administrator

Chiwoniso Kaitano is the 10th executive director of the MacDowell, an arts residency program, a position she was appointed to in 2023. She is the first Black person to hold that position.

== Career ==
Kataino holds a law degree from the London School of Economics and a master's degree in international affairs from Columbia University.

She served as a junior human rights advocate at Human Rights Watch in the early part of her career before spending a decade in technology.

She then she stepped into arts administration roles. She was appointed executive director of Girl Be Heard, a female performance nonprofit, in 2019. Before that she had been executive director of the Ifetayo Cultural Arts Academy in Brooklyn.

== Personal life ==
Kaitano is originally from Zimbabwe. She is married to Andy Sabl, and lives in Brooklyn with her family.
