= Ethel Mars (artist) =

American woodblock print artist (1876–1959)

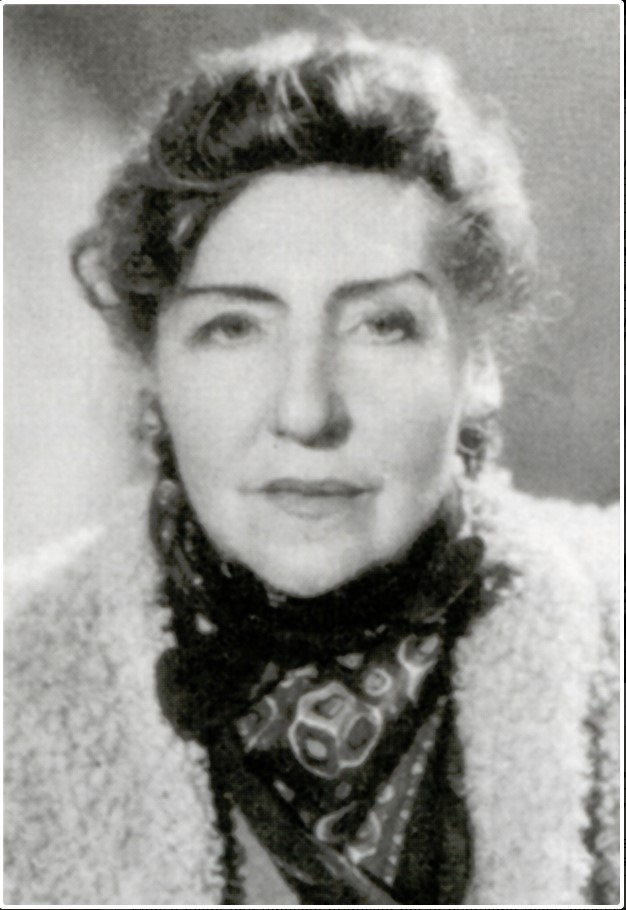
- Ethel Mars, 1925 (An American in Paris)
- Born: September 19, 1876; Springfield, Illinois
- Died: March 23, 1959 (aged 82); France
- Resting place: Saint Paul de Vence Cemetery, Saint-Paul-de-Vence, France; 43.694°N 7.121°E
- Education: Art Academy of Cincinnati
- Known for: Provincetown Prints

Ethel Mars (September 19, 1876 – March 23, 1959) was an American woodblock print artist, known for her white-line woodcut prints, also known as Provincetown Prints, and a children's book illustrator. She had a lifelong relationship with fellow artist Maud Hunt Squire, with whom she lived in Paris and Provincetown, Massachusetts.

== Early life and education ==
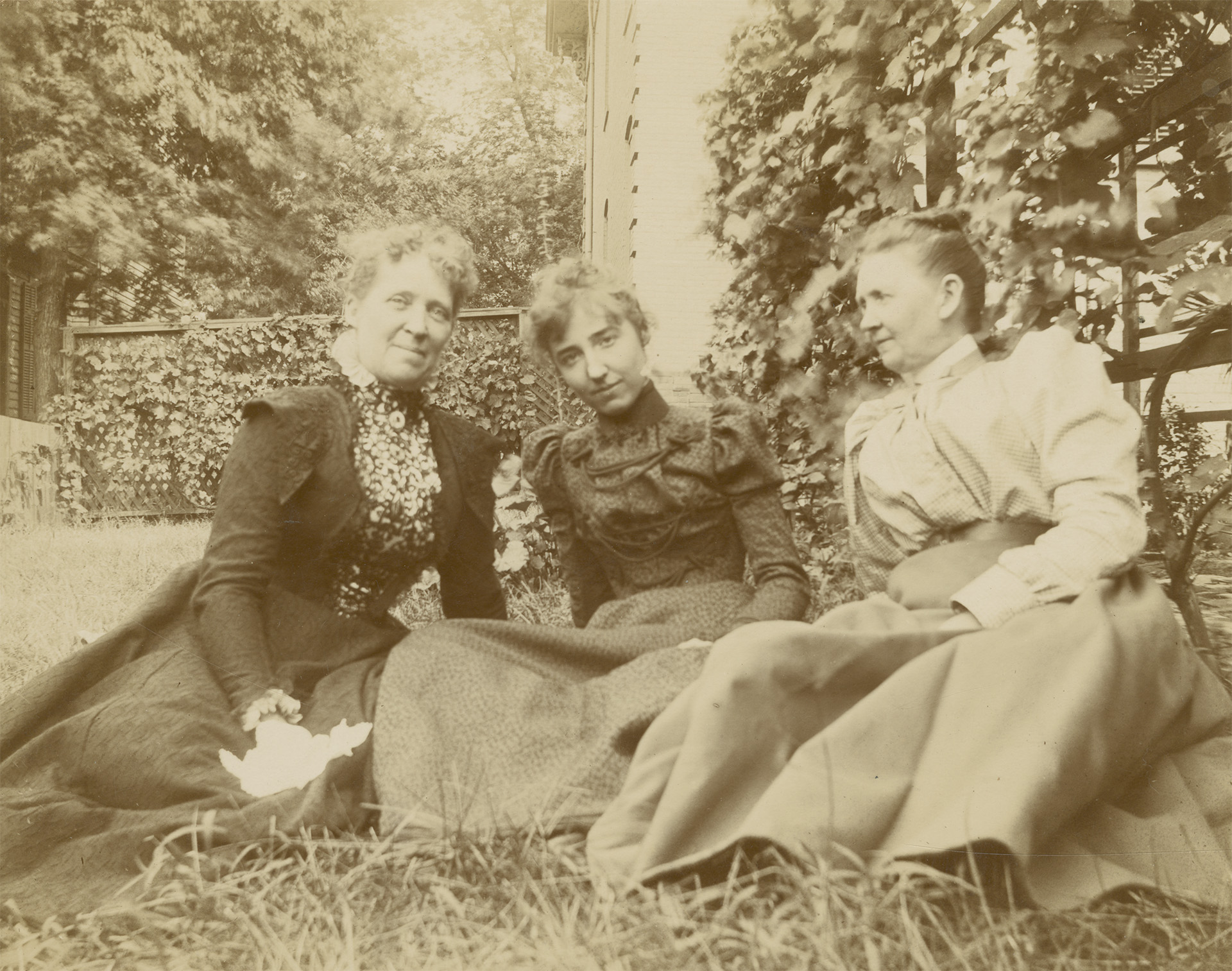
Ethel Mars (center) with her mother and aunt c.1898, Department of Image Collections, National Gallery of Art Library, Washington, DC.

Ethel Mars was born in Springfield, Illinois, in 1876 to Adelia and Alonzo Mars, a railroad clerk. During most of her childhood, Mars and her parents lived with her mother's parents. She began creating art as a young girl, for which she won prizes at the Illinois State Fair. Mars attended socials and church teas and was known to have a "voice of wonderful power and sweetness."

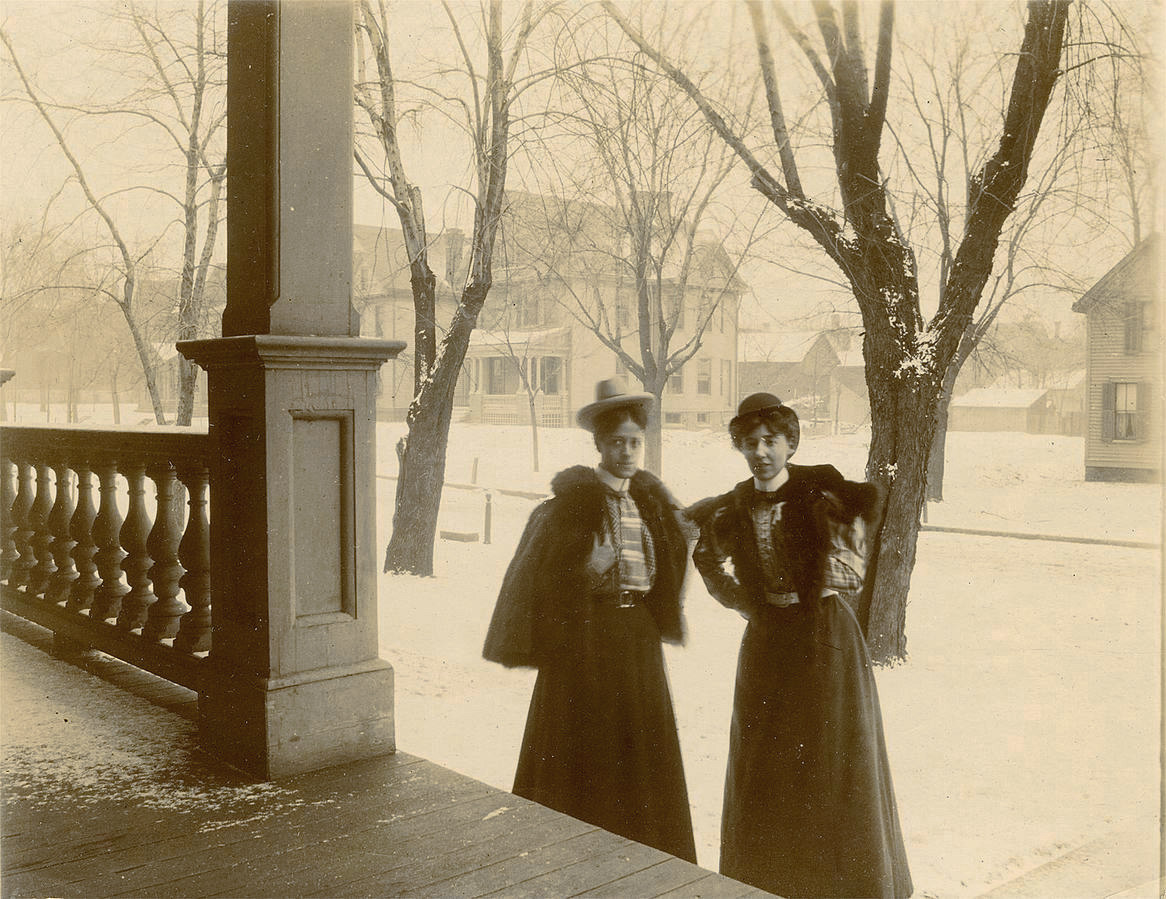
Maud Hunt Squire and Ethel Mars (right), Springfield, Illinois, c.1898, Department of Image Collections, National Gallery of Art Library, Washington, DC.

After the McClernand Grade School, Mars secured a scholarship and attended the Art Academy of Cincinnati beginning in 1892. While there, she met and began a lifelong relationship with Maud Hunt Squire (1873–1954), living mostly in Europe. Lewis Henry Meakin and Frank Duveneck provided instruction, which included drawing, illustration, and painting. Edna Boies Hopkins was a friend of both Squire and Mars throughout their lives.

== Career ==
Mars began working as a book illustrator in New York, as did Squire, after she completed her training in Cincinnati. She continued to win prizes at the Illinois State Fairs during her trips home to visit her parents. Mars and Squire traveled to Europe beginning in 1900. Both Mars and Squire created illustrations for Children of Our Town by Carolyn Wells and Adventures of Ulysses by Charles Lamb in 1902.

During one of their trips, they visited Munich in 1904, where Mars learned to make color woodcut prints. About 1905, Mars made the print of a Paris street scene, Untitled (Woman at Shop Window), the "decoratively patterned" work is similar to the intimist works of Édouard Vuillard and Pierre Bonnard.

Along with the wave of artist moving to France at the turn of the century, the pair moved to Paris in 1906. Mars made chalk drawings, paintings, and woodblock prints. Her work is described as follows, "in landscapes, portraits, domestic vignettes, street and café scenes, Mars's work is distinguished by its flat forms, bold simplicity of design and lively color." Mars shared her woodblock printmaking techniques with visiting American artists. She regularly exhibited and juried shows at Salon d'Automne, where she was an elected member. She was also a member of Société des Beaux-Arts. Besides being regularly exhibited in Paris, she also exhibited throughout the United States. In 1909, Harper's Weekly published her painting Woman with a Monkey, which won the "Best Painting by a Woman" award at the Society of Western Artists the next year.

Mars began wearing bright makeup, dying her hair red, and living a bohemian lifestyle. The duo's friends included Pablo Picasso and Henri Matisse that they met at 27 rue de Fleurus, the salon of Gertrude Stein, who in 1910 portrayed Mars and Squire as "gay" in her poem Miss Furr and Miss Skeene. In it, Georgine Skeene refers to Squire and Helen Furr refers to Mars. The poem is considered to be the first one to use the word "gay", meaning homosexual, in literature. A "seminal contribution to LGBT Lesbian literature", in 1922, Stein's poem was printed in Vanity Fair.

Mars and Squire helped to form the Amateur Art Study Club, now the Springfield Art Association, in Springfield during a 1909 trip to the United States. After returning to Paris, they sent works of art to the group for exhibition.

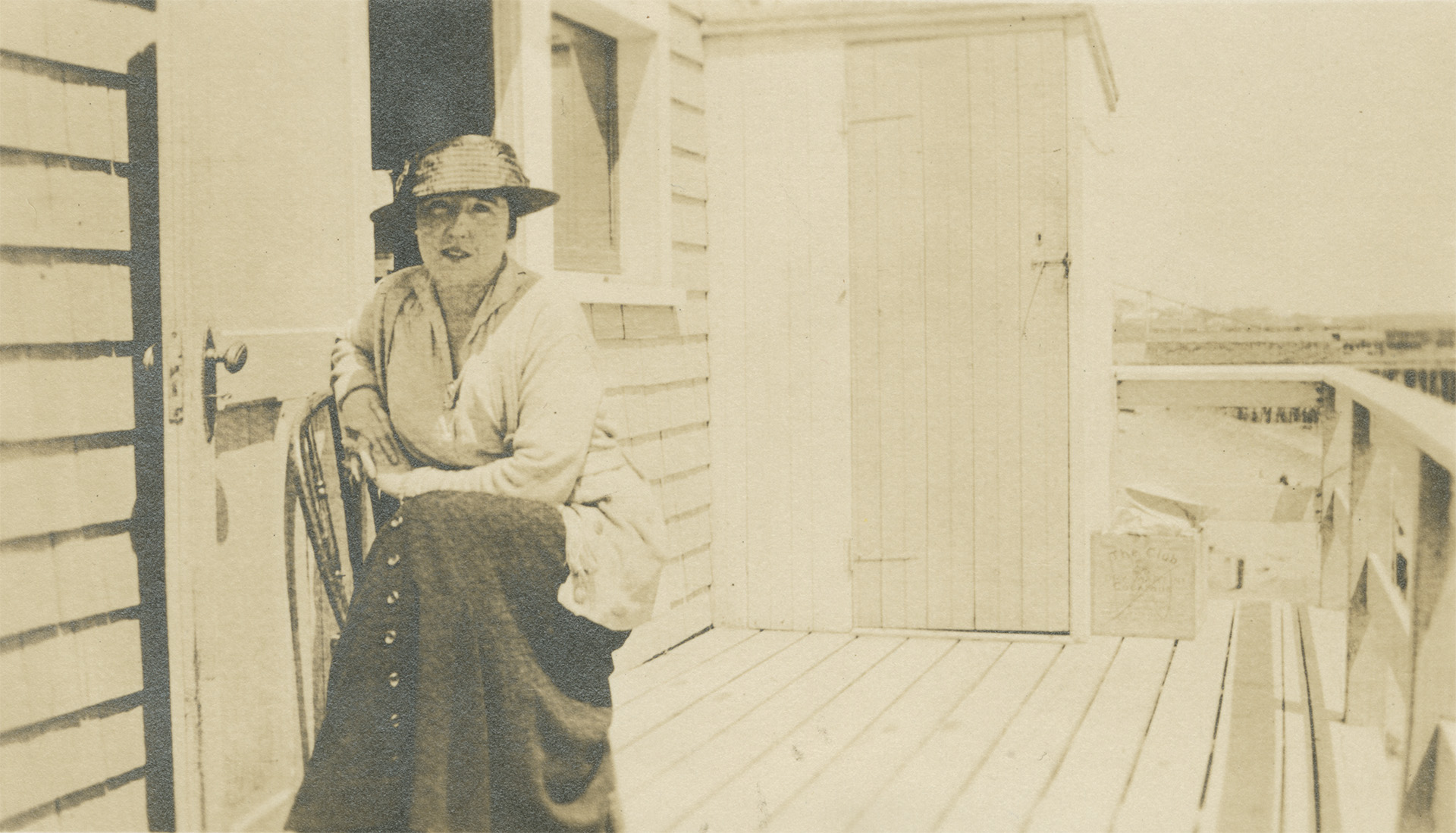
Ethel Mars, Provincetown, c.1918, Department of Image Collections, National Gallery of Art Library, Washington, DC.

Mars was an ambulance driver at the beginning of World War I, but the two women returned to the United States for their safety. They moved to Provincetown, Massachusetts, on Cape Cod, where Mars began using a white-line woodcut technique that came to be associated with the Provincetown Printers, an artist colony of woodblock printers. The town was generally an artist colony with an international reputation. While there, Mars taught printmaking using woodblocks. Besides being regularly exhibited in Paris, she also exhibited throughout the United States. Hopkins, also a woodblock printmaker, became affiliated with the Provincetown Printers.

Mars and Squire moved to Vence, France on the French Riviera in the early 1920s. Mars illustrated children's books. At time she collaborated with Squire, like Charles Kingsley's Heroes of Greek Mythology, which was published in 1923. The women worked as printmakers and painters until the 1930s. During World War II, they lived in a hotel in Isère, near Grenoble. Squire died in either 1954 or 1955 and Mars died either in 1956 or after 1958, about the time that she is believed to have created a self-portrait. She is also been said to have died on March 23, 1959, in the town of La Farigoule. They are buried together in Saint-Paul-de-Vence. A joint exhibit of the women's works was held at the Mary Ryan Gallery in New York in 2000. Mars' work is among the collections of the Cincinnati Art Museum, Boston Museum of Fine Arts, Smithsonian American Art Museum, Springfield Art Association Further and Illate Museum.

== Gallery ==
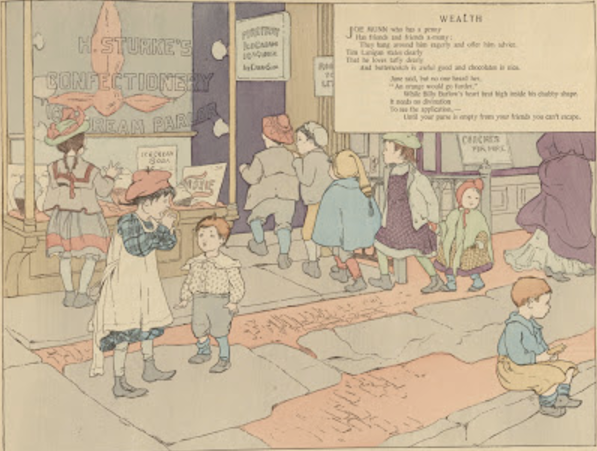
"Wealth" from Children of Our Town, 1902, written by Carolyn Wells and illustrated by Ethel Mars and Maud Hunt Squire

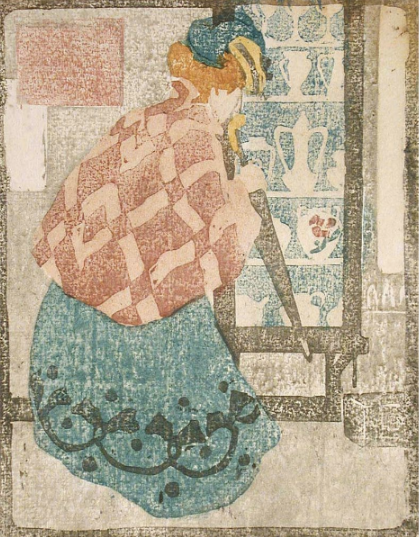
Untitled (Woman at Shop Window), ca 1905, Indianapolis Museum of Art

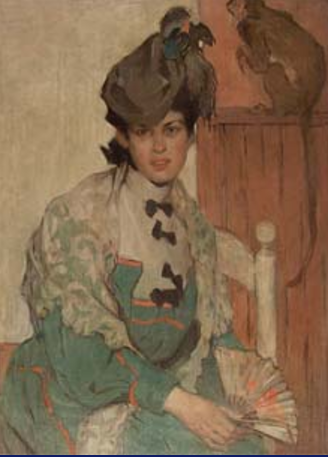
Woman with a Monkey, 1909, which may be a self-portrait

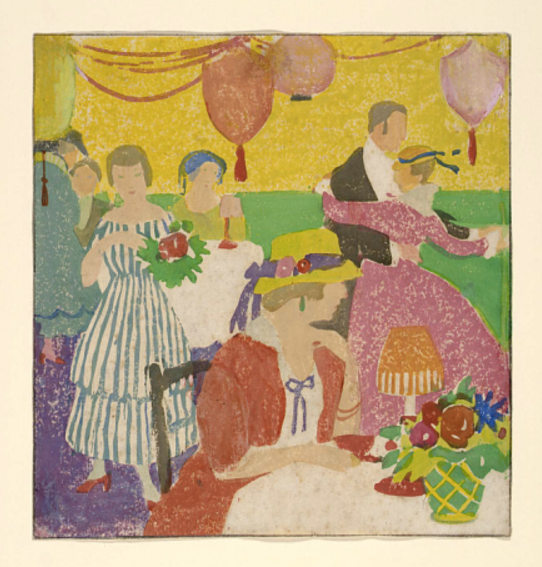
Untitled, ca. 1916, Smithsonian American Art Museum
