= Edna Boies Hopkins =

American artist (1872–1937)

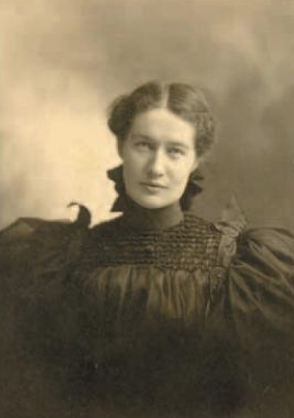
Edna Boies Hopkins, 1894

Edna Boies Hopkins (October 13, 1872 – March 24, 1937) was an American artist who made woodblock prints, based upon Japanese ukiyo-e art and Arthur Wesley Dow's formula of three main elements: notan, a balance of light and dark, line and color.

== Early life and education ==
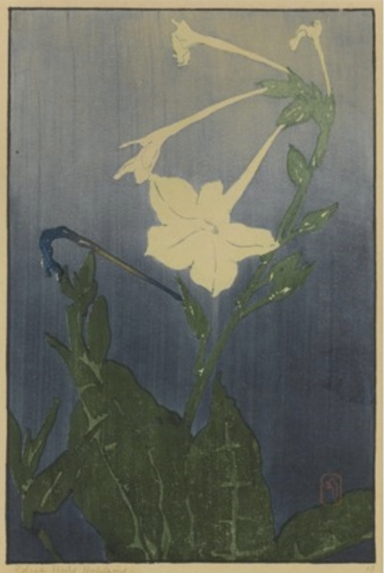
Edna Boies Hopkins, Nicotiana, ca. 1909

Edna Bel Beachboard was born on October 13, 1872 in Hudson, Michigan to Cotilda C. Sawyer and David J. Beachboard, vice president of Boies State Bank. Her sole sibling was Earl James, who died in 1887 at the age of 16 from diphtheria. On March 2, 1892, at 19 years of age, she married 27 year-old banker John Henry Boies. Like the Bearchboards, he was a prominent member of the community. Boies accepted a position in the banking industry in Chicago and the couple moved there. He contracted tuberculosis and Edna and John moved to Colorado to recuperate in the drier climate. He died in Denver on December 10, 1894. Edna Boies maintained a close relationship with her sister-in-law, Bessie Boies. After John Boies died, she enrolled in the Art Academy of Cincinnati in 1895. Edna studied illustration, life drawing, wood carving, and sculpture until 1899. While there, she met fellow student James Roy Hopkins of Mechanicsburg, Ohio. She shared an interest in woodblock printing with fellow students, Maud Hunt Squire and Ethel Mars, who became members of the Provincetown Printers on Cape Cod, Massachusetts.

Boies then moved to New York and beginning in April 1899, she studied with Evelyn Fenner Shaurman and Arthur Wesley Dow at Pratt Institute in Brooklyn. She studied commercial art, composition, and watercolor until March 1900. Dow introduced her to ukiyo-e, Japanese woodblock printing, and a formula of three main elements: notan, a balance of light and dark, line and color. Circa 1900, Boies carved Enchanted Lilies, one of her first woodblock prints.

== Career ==
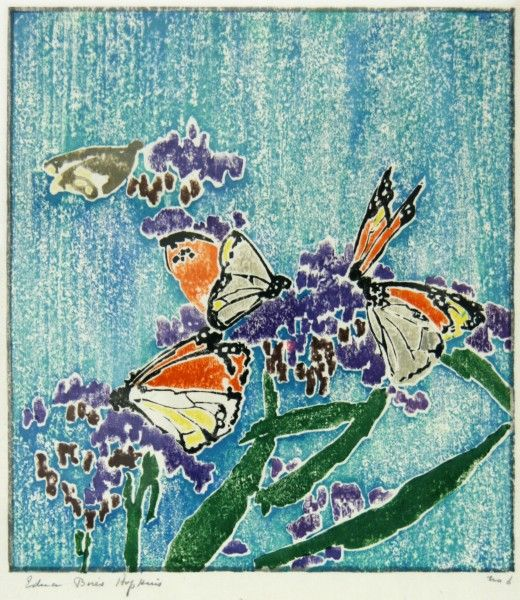
Edna Boies Hoffman, Butterflies, about 1914-1915, Cincinnati Art Museum

Boies taught traditional forms of art, Art Nouveau, and techniques that she learned from Dow at Veltin School for Girls by March 1900.

If you are in the country, there will be wild carrots, poppies, golden rod, asters, thistles, blue and white, and butterflies. Sit down and watch poppies bend when the wind blows. Notice the lines of the poppies to the ground, how they grow; notice them when a storm is coming… See the color of the green leaves when the sun shines through them. Lie on the ground and see the shapes between the leaves, its mass against the sky… As soon as you take the veil off your eyes, see nature, gather impressions, you will be a greater artist.
—Lecture given to Hopkin's class by Isabelle Sprague Smith

She married James Roy Hopkins on September 13, 1904. They travelled to the Far East and Africa and then moved to Paris. They lived there until the outbreak of World War I, when they returned to the United States and settled in Ohio. A special exhibition of Hopkins' color woodcuts was held at the Cincinnati Art Museum in fall 1914. An exhibit of her work was held at the Women's Art Club in December.

Her husband's career required him to stay in Ohio, but Hopkins spent summers in Provincetown, Massachusetts. She rented a studio in New York over several visits to the city. The couple moved to Paris by 1920 and lived there for three years. It is thought that Hopkins stopped making works of art due to arthritis.

Edna Hopkins died at Harper Hospital in Detroit, Michigan, most likely of ovarian cancer, on March 24, 1937.

== Sources ==
- Vasseur, Dominique H. (2007). Edna Boies Hopkins: Strong in Character, Colorful in Expression. Ohio University Press. ISBN 978-0-8214-1769-0.
- Weidman, Jeffrey; Oberlin College. Library (2000). Artists in Ohio, 1787-1900: A Biographical Dictionary. Kent State University Press. p. 423. ISBN 978-0-87338-616-6.
