= Maud Hunt Squire =

American painter and printmaker (1873–1954)

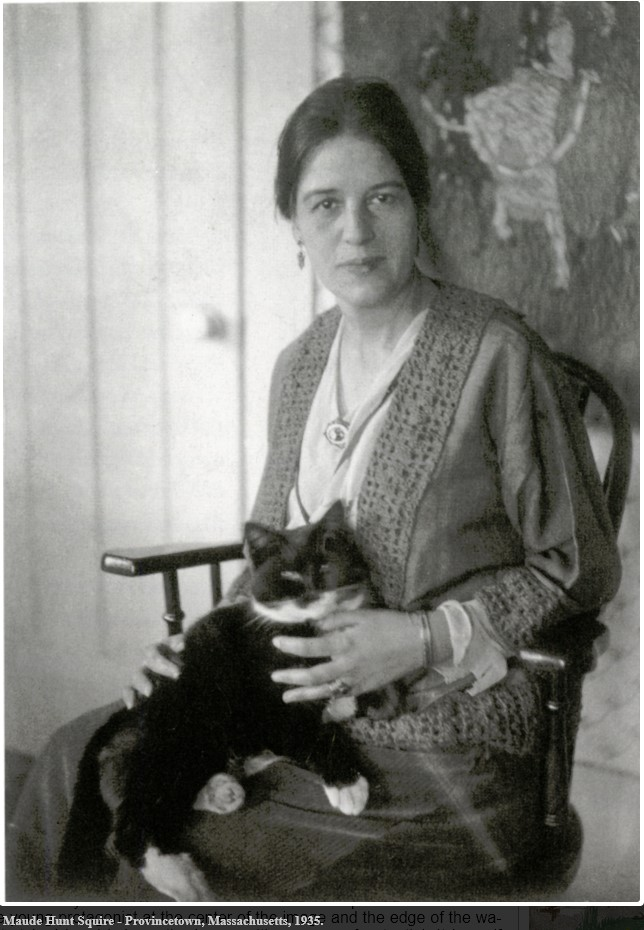
- Squire in 1935
- Born: January 30, 1873; Milford, Ohio, U.S.
- Died: October 25, 1954 (aged 81) "La Farigoule", Vence, France
- Resting place: Saint Paul de Vence Cemetery, Saint-Paul-de-Vence, France; 43.694°N 7.121°E
- Education: Art Academy

Maud Hunt Squire (January 30, 1873 – October 25, 1954) was an American painter and printmaker. She had a lifelong relationship with artist Ethel Mars, with whom she traveled and lived in the United States and France.

== Early life and education ==
Squire was born on January 20, 1873, in Milford, Ohio to her mother and Alfred Squire, who was a violinist and musician. Alfred gave music lessons and owned a music store. Her mother gave lessons in drawing. Squire was a talented musician and artist and was gifted in other languages.

Squire attended the University of Cincinnati and graduated in 1894. Squire studied at the Art Academy of Cincinnati from 1894 to 1898; her instructors were Lewis Henry Meakin and Frank Duveneck. The second in her class, she received the Alumnal Gold Medal for excellence in mathematics and Latin and the Sinton Gold Medal, which was awarded by the board.

== Career ==
Squire gained notice for her color intaglio prints and her work in colored pastels, and was active as a book illustrator beginning while she was still a student; much of her work in the field was published jointly with Mars. She became a member of the Société Salon d'Automne, the Société des Dessinateurs et d'Humoristes, and the Société Nationale des Beaux-Arts, and exhibited work widely, including at the Pan Pacific International Exposition of 1915. A joint exhibit of works by Squire and Mars was held at the Mary Ryan Gallery in New York in 2000.

== Personal life ==
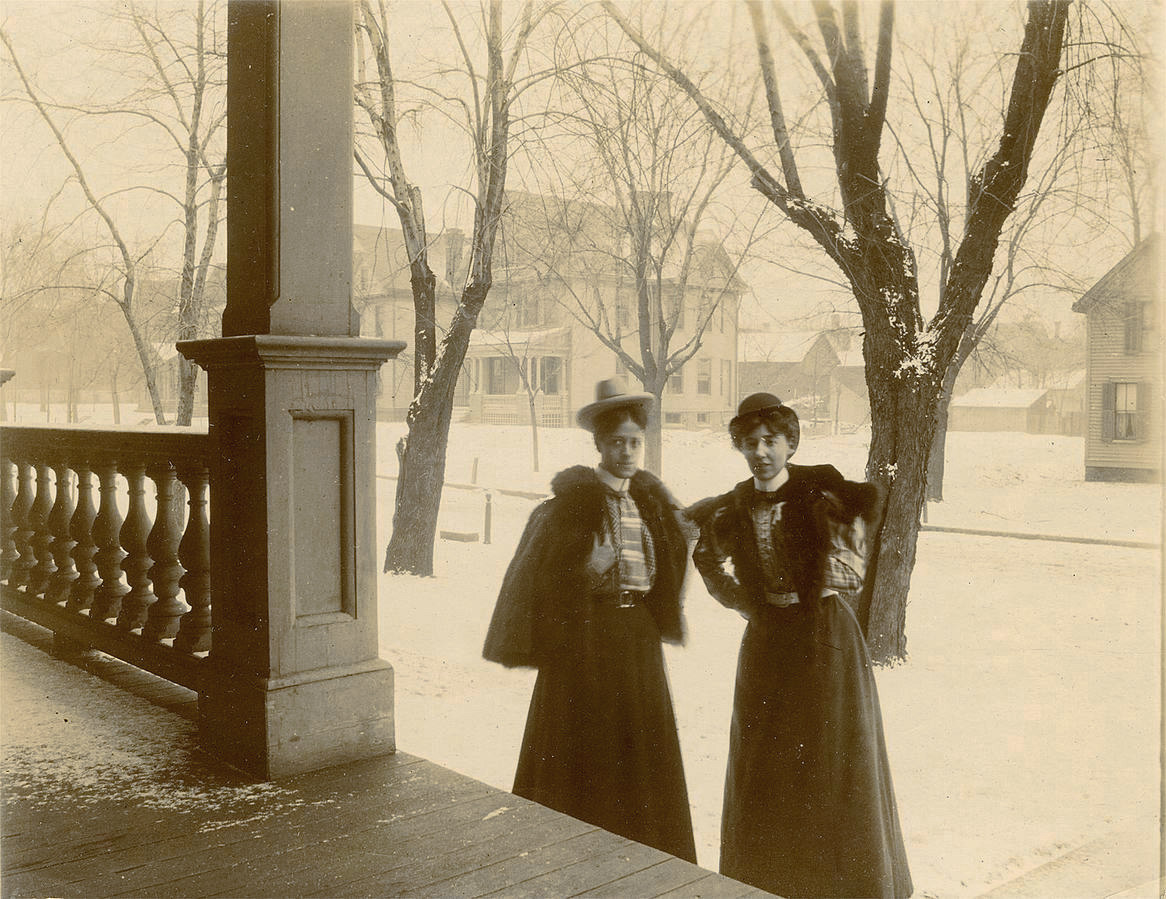
Maud Hunt Squire and Ethel Mars (right), Springfield, Illinois, c.1898.

She met Ethel Mars, with whom she would remain for the rest of her life, at the Art Academy of Cincinnati. The couple went to Paris in 1903, remaining there until the outbreak of World War I forced them to return to the United States in 1915. They went to Provincetown, Massachusetts, both becoming active in the local art scene. Some years later they returned to France, living in Vence for the rest of their lives while traveling throughout Europe.

Squire and Mars were great friends of Gertrude Stein and Alice B. Toklas while living in France, and the writer's poem "Miss Furr and Miss Skeene", believed to be the first such work to use the word "gay" to describe homosexuality, is meant to describe the couple. Edna Boies Hopkins was another friend of both Squire and Mars throughout their lives; she also attended the Art Academy and lived near them in Paris.

The couple went into hiding in Grenoble during World War II, but returned to their home, La Farigoule, afterwards. Squire died of heart failure there on October 25, 1954, and is buried with Mars, who survived her, in the town cemetery of Saint-Paul-de-Vence.

== Gallery ==
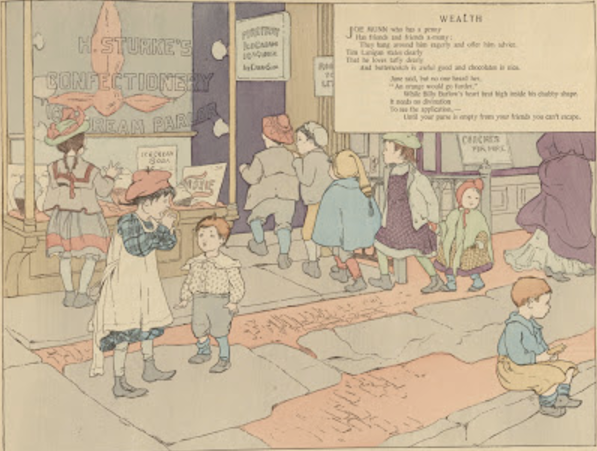
Children of Our Town, Wealth, 1902

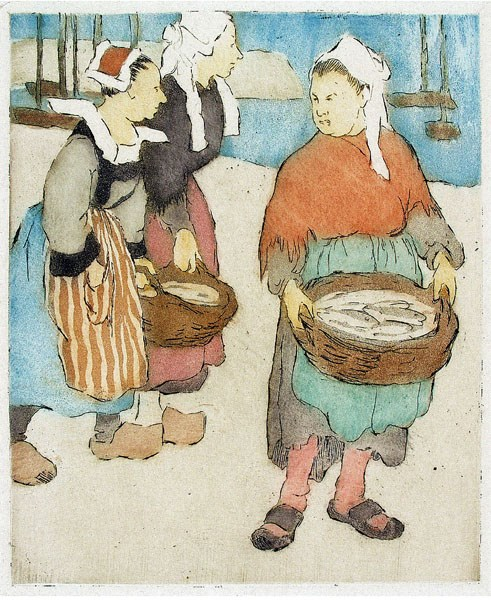
Le panier de poissons, eau-forte en couleur (1910), Maud Hunt Squire

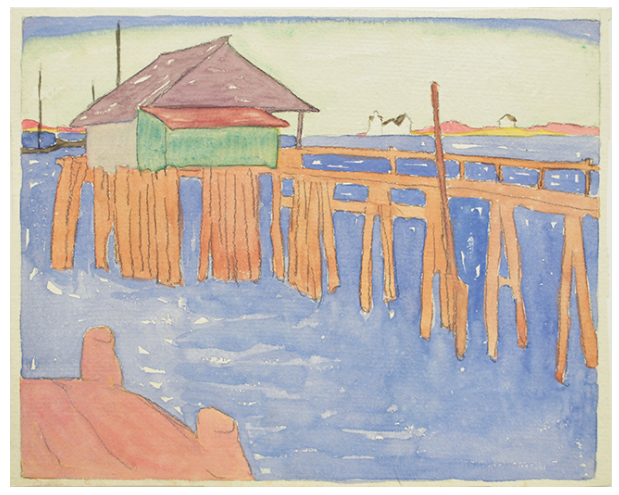
Untitled (Pier with green and purple shack), Watercolor and graphite ca. 1915.

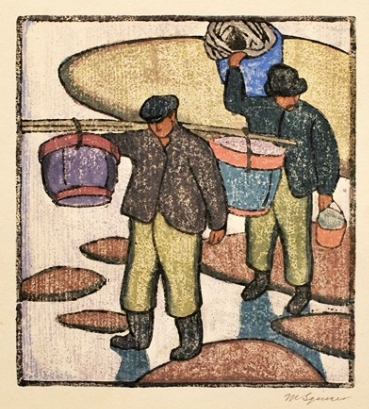
Maud Hunt Squire, Clam Diggers, woodcut print, 1917
