= Art Academy of Cincinnati =

Private art school in Cincinnati, Ohio

Coordinates: 39.1089°N 84.5139°W

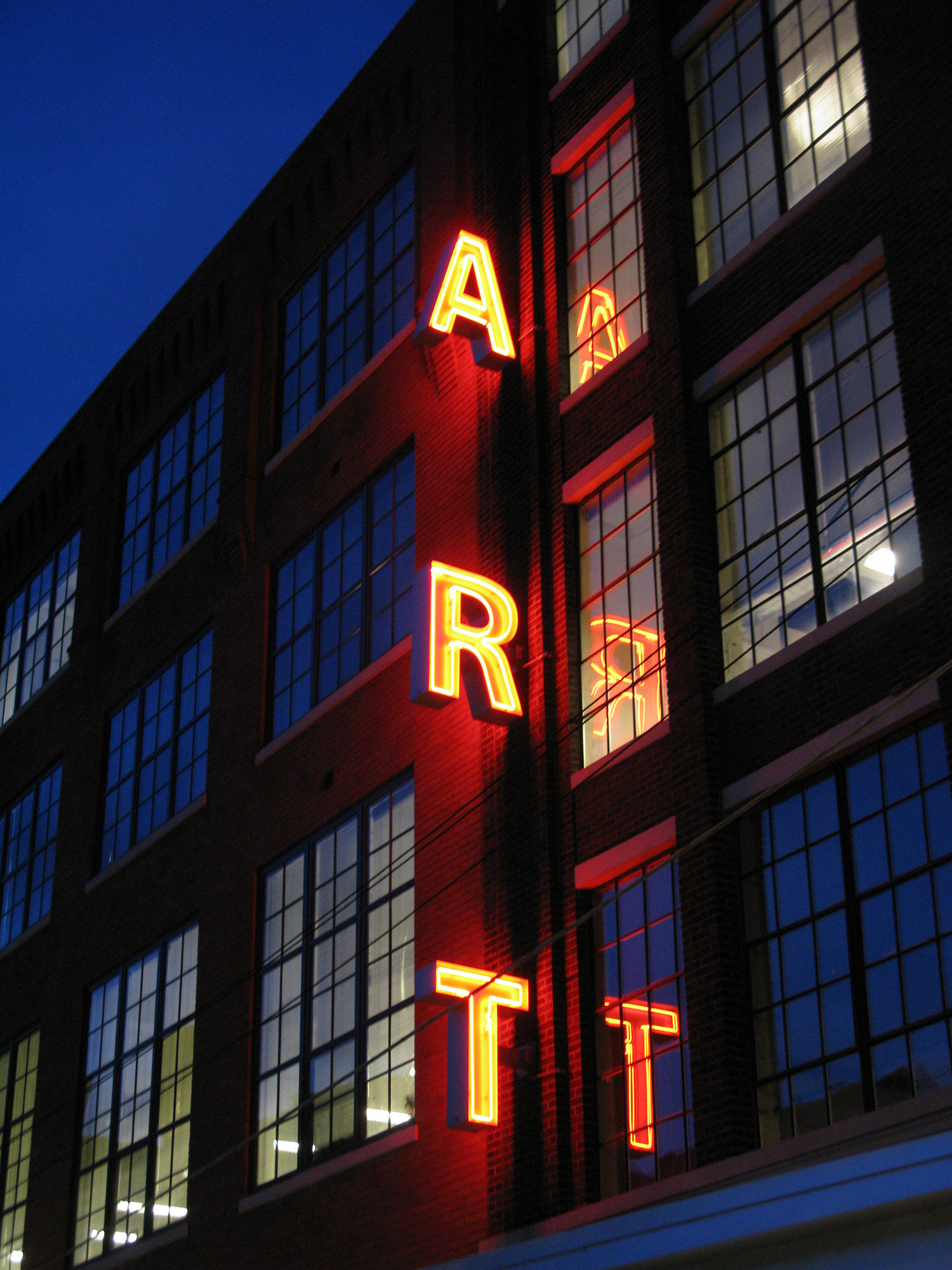
- Motto: "Make Art, Make a Difference"
- Type: Private
- Established: 1869
- President: Joe Girandola
- Dean: Sarah Stolar
- Undergraduates: 245
- Postgraduates: 21
- Location: Cincinnati, Ohio, United States
- Campus: Urban
- Colors: Orange and grey
- Website: http://www.artacademy.edu

The Art Academy of Cincinnati is a private college of art and design in Cincinnati, Ohio, United States. It was founded as the McMicken School of Design in 1869, and was a department of the University of Cincinnati, and later in 1887, became the Art Academy of Cincinnati, the museum school of the Cincinnati Art Museum. The college is accredited by the National Association of Schools of Art and Design, and a member of the Strategic Ohio Council for Higher Education (SOCHE).

== History ==
In 1998, the Art Academy of Cincinnati legally separated from the museum and became an independent college of art and design. Degrees granted are the Associate of Science in Graphic Design; the Bachelor of Fine Arts in Creative Writing, Design, Illustration, Painting and Drawing, Photography, Print Media, and Sculpture; and the Master of Arts in Art Education, which is taught during summer semesters.

The Art Academy moved into its current facility at 1212 Jackson St. in the Over-the-Rhine neighborhood in the fall of 2005. This move has been pivotal in the Over-the-Rhine revitalization and renovation as an arts district. The new facility provides 24-hour access for students with around the clock security. Students are guaranteed studio spaces in their junior and senior years. The 12th and Jackson St. building also has an open air atrium, connecting two formerly separate buildings, enlarged classroom spaces, computer labs, a student commons area, lecture hall, and Learning Services Center. In 2008, the Art Academy facility received Leadership in Energy and Environment Design (LEED) Green Building certification by the United States Green Building Council (USGBC).

AAC housing is encouraged for out-of-town Art Academy freshmen at the Academy Housing Facility at the nearby corner of 13th and Jackson streets. 33 loft style apartments renovated in collaboration with Urban Sites came online in 2020. Suites for 110 students are available, each with fully equipped kitchens, and with communal laundry facilities. Resident advisors live on the premises.

== Galleries ==
The college features three public galleries that offer changing art exhibitions, the Pearlman Gallery, the Chidlaw Gallery and the McClure Gallery. Exhibitions include emerging and professional artists, students, faculty and alumni artists.

== Notable alumni and faculty ==
- Wilbur G. Adam (1898–1973), divided his career between Cincinnati and Chicago; best known as a portrait painter and for his landscapes of the western US
- Josef Albers (1888–1976), German-born American artist and educator whose work, both in Europe and in the US, formed the basis of modern art education programs of the twentieth century; taught at the academy of Cincinnati in 1949
- Paul Chidlaw (1900–1989), modern painter and long-time instructor at the academy; Chidlaw Gallery is named after him
- Kreigh Collins (1908–1974), cartoonist and creator of Kevin the Bold
- Petah Coyne, sculptor and installation artist
- Jenny Eakin Delony (aka Jenny Delony, Jenny Meyrowitz, Jenny Eakin Delony Rice) (1866–1949), painter and educator who specialized in portraiture, miniatures, landscape, wildlife, still life, and genre
- Frank Duveneck (1848–1919), portrait painter; taught at the academy during the 1890s and later became its chairman; fought with the Cincinnati Art Museum administration for students' right to study directly from the live nude model
- Frances Farrand Dodge (1878–1969), artist and teacher, appreciated by critics for her command of all media, including oil, pencil, etching, and watercolor
- James Flora (1914–1998), idiosyncratic album cover illustrator for RCA Victor and Columbia Records during the 1940s and 1950s, commercial illustrator, fine artist, and author and illustrator of seventeen popular children's books
- Tim Folzenlogen, contemporary realist painter based in New York City
- Daniel Garber (1880–1958), landscape painter and member of the art colony in New Hope, Pennsylvania
- Marie Bruner Haines (1885–1979), painter and illustrator
- Charley Harper (1922–2007), Cincinnati-based Modernist artist, best known for his highly stylized wildlife prints, posters and book illustrations
- Eli Harvey (1860–1957), sculptor, painter, and animalier
- Edna Boies Hopkins (1872–1937), artist of woodblock prints
- Maud Hunt Squire (1873–1954), painter and printmaker
- J. Augustus Knapp, esoteric illustrator of The Secret Teachings of All Ages
- Louise Lawson (1860s–1899), sculptor
- Noel Martin, graphic designer who revolutionized type and publication standards for American museums, later a professor at the Art Academy of Cincinnati and the University of Cincinnati
- Lewis Henry Meakin (1850–1917)
- Lê Hiền Minh (born 1979), installation artist
- Myra Musselmann-Carr (born 1880), sculptor who exhibited at the Armory Show in 1913
- Frank Harmon Myers (1899–1956), painter whose work includes seascapes
- Thomas Satterwhite Noble (1835–1907), painter and teacher
- Elizabeth Nourse (1859–1938), realist and genre painter later based in Paris best known for her depictions of peasant women
- Roy Cleveland Nuse (1885–1975), Pennsylvania impressionist artist and teacher at the Pennsylvania Academy of the Fine Arts
- Anna Oliver (1840–1892), preacher (attended)
- Ruthe Katherine Pearlman (1913–2007), Cincinnati-based artist and educator who worked with Art Beyond Boundaries from its inception in 2005, Pearlman gallery is named after her
- Louis Rebisso (1837–1899), sculptor and teacher whose students at the academy included William Jacob Baer, Solon Borglum, Janet Scudder, Mary Chase Perry, Louise Lawson, and Eli Harvey
- John Ruthven (1927–2020), artist specialized in wildlife paintings
- Paul Sawyier (1865–1917), Kentucky artist and impressionist
- Joseph Henry Sharp (1873–1892), one of six founding members of the Taos Society of Artists
- Mary Given Sheerer (1865–1954), ceramicist and instructor affiliated with Newcomb Pottery
- Harry Shokler (1896–1978), 20th-century artist known for his oil paintings and screen prints
- Julian Stanczak, abstract painter and founder of the Op Art movement
- Tony Tasset (born 1960), multimedia artist
- Edward Charles Volkert (1871–1935), Cincinnati-based post-impressionist painter of oil and watercolor cattle paintings from the Old Lyme Art Colony
- John Ellsworth Weis (1892–1962), faculty member
- Tom Wesselmann (1931–2004), pop artist of The Great American Nude series of paintings
