= Ruthe Katherine Pearlman =

American painter, art propagandist, art educator and philanthropist

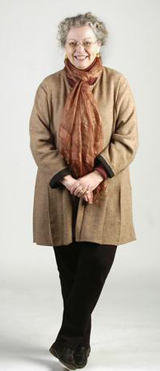
- Ruthe K. Pearlman
- Born: June 30, 1913; Connersville, Indiana, United States
- Died: January 30, 2007; Cincinnati, Ohio, United States
- Occupation(s): Artist and educator

Ruthe Katherine Pearlman (June 30, 1913 – January 30, 2007) was an American painter, art propagandist, art educator and philanthropist.

== Career ==
She completed an art certificate program at New York Academy of Art in 1939, and was an instructor at the Art Academy of Cincinnati until December 2006, so she entered the Art Academy in 1929 at age of 16 and virtually never left. Ruthe traveled extensively with her husband throughout the United States and Europe always bringing new work and exhibiting at Art Academy of Cincinnati. She also had a studio in Cincinnati where she taught students for many years.

In February 2008 the Art Academy of Cincinnati named the main gallery in their exhibit halls in her honor.

Despite being diagnosed with macular degeneration in 1988 she continued to work and even went on to teach others with visual impairments. This led her to Art Beyond Boundaries, which was created in 2005 for people with disabilities who want to create art.

Her art is exhibited at Art Academy of Cincinnati and a number of private collections in Cincinnati, Ohio and Baltimore, Maryland.

She was awarded an Honorary Doctorate of Fine Art by the Academy in 2002 and founded the Ruthe G. (after her madden name - Gottman) Pearlman Gallery in 2005.

== Legacy ==
- 2008 - Art Academy of Cincinnati Pearlman Gallery
