= Veltin School for Girls =

Location
- 160–192 West 74th Street; Manhattan, New York; United States

Information
- Type: Private
- Established: 1886
- Founder: Louise Veltin
- Closed: 1924
- Principal: Isabelle Sprague Smith

Veltin School for Girls was a private school founded in Manhattan, New York. It was founded by Louise Veltin in 1886. The school was sold to the De La Salle Institute in 1924.

== History ==
Veltin School for Girls was a private school founded by Louise Veltin (Note: Louise Veltin, also Louise de l'Veltin, was born in Paris, France, on January 8, 1856. Her parents were also born in France. Her mother was Henrietta, and her step-father was Victor Spaenhoven / Spenhoven, who dealt in second-hand furniture. Veltin emigrated to the United States in 1864. In 1880, she taught French, and she became a naturalized citizen in 1893. She lived at 29 West 68th Street in New York, as did the Sprague Smith family. Veltin died on January 7, 1934, in New York.) in 1886 in Manhattan, New York. Veltin and Isabelle Sprague Smith were the school's principals.

Lillian Link, a graduate of the school, led an effort to raise the funds among other alumni for the construction of the Veltin Studio at the MacDowell Colony in Peterborough, New Hampshire, in 1912 in honor of Louise Veltin's role as an educator and philanthropist. Veltin sat on the board of the MacDowell Colony, and Link was later a resident artist at the colony. Link also managed the fund-raising for the Isabelle Sprague Smith Studio in 1915. Sprague Smith was a member of the MacDowell Club and a corporate member of the MacDowell Colony memorial association.

The school was sold in 1924 to the De La Salle Institute. It is now the site of the Robert L. Beir Lower School Building of the Calhoun School, a co-educational private school.

== Campus ==
The school was initially located at 175 West 73rd Street, but moved in 1892 to a five-story building located at 160–192 W. 74th Street. In addition to classrooms, it had an art department, study rooms, an auditorium, a library and a gymnasium.

== Academics ==
The school prepared girls for education at Wellesley, Bryn Mawr, Vassar, Barnard and other colleges. It was particularly noted for its French language and art instruction and advanced classes, like physics, astronomy, and physiology. Robert Henri taught art, and Frank and Clara Damrosch taught music. It was also called, or also had, the Veltin Studio at the location.

== Student life ==
The school had a chapter of Phi Mu Gamma that was established in 1902.

== Notable people ==
=== Alumni ===
- Dorothy Arnold, socialite
- Agnes Crimmins, playwright
- Mildred Esterbrook, social welfare leader and among many roles, national director of the Girl Scouts
- Malvina Hoffman, sculptor
- Susanne Langer, philosopher, educator and writer
- Lillian Link, sculptor
- Grace Hamilton McIntyre, artist
- Katharine Rhoades, artist
- Kay Swift, composer
- Helen Damrosch Tee-Van, artist

=== Faculty ===
- Clara Damrosch, music teacher
- Frank Damrosch, music teacher
- Robert Henri, art teacher beginning in 1900
- Edna Boies Hopkins, art teacher beginning 1900
- Laura I. Mattoon, science teacher
- Isabelle Sprague Smith, principal
- Louise Veltin, principal
