= Tim Folzenlogen =

American painter

Solace. 2001. Oil on paper.

Tim Folzenlogen (born May 2, 1952) is a contemporary realist painter based in New York City. His work has been shown in more than 50 solo shows, and he has sold more than 1000 paintings. Most of his works depict architectural details in New York City, and the way features of buildings are illuminated by slanting rays of light.

== Biography ==
Folzenlogen was born and raised in Cincinnati, Ohio. He graduated from the Art Academy of Cincinnati in 1974. He moved to Washington Heights, Manhattan in 1982.

Folzenlogen dropped out of the gallery world in 2002 to focus on public art projects, his current emphasis. His works have become more popular with New York City's merchant class and Wall Street banks.

== Style and critical reception ==
Folzenlogen's work has been compared to Edward Hopper and Vincent van Gogh. Critics have called his approach cutting edge and jarring, though in many ways the content of his paintings is familiar and comfortable.

His most common subject matter is the architecture of New York City or scenes of pedestrians. Though a contemporary realism painter, his use of light in these works gives them an impressionistic quality. Dorn Townsend writes in the Manhattan Times, "The everyday aspects of the city have seldom been translated with such brio and glowing reverence" and "every color and every gesture stirs inside the viewer"

In Artspeak, Ed McCormack writes: "...few painters - aside from Wayne Thiebaud, the California artist generally acknowledged as the grand old man of Painterly Realism - have fully succeeded in this complex endeavor. A singular exception is the young Ohio born painter Tim Folzenlogen.... Like Hopper, Folzenlogen is a true painter of the American scene, with the ability to convey a sense of the urban experience in formal rather than anecdotal, terms, establishing emotional resonance through spatial tensions and strong tonal contrasts."

== Philosophy ==
Folzenlogen's views and opinions are expressed in the roughly 20 essays on his web site. In the essay "Dry Paint," he expands a narrow discussion of painting to a broad analogy of human contact. The essay uses the details of an artist's experience to comment on life, an appeal to see something special within the ordinary, a quality with which he seeks to imbue his art.

Taking the perspectives of others is an important theme for Folzenlogen. He writes, "Consider the 'other' [person] as deeply as you consider yourself, and you will always find that he or she is thinking and doing exactly what you would think or do, if you were him or her."

Daddy. 2001. Oil on panel.
