= Frank Harmon Myers =

American painter (1899–1956)

Frank Harmon Myers (1899 – March 7, 1956) was an American impressionist painter. His work includes a variety of topics but is best known for his seascapes.

== Personal life ==
Frank H. Myers was born in Cleves, Ohio. His family moved to Cincinnati in 1907. Myers studied at the Art Academy of Cincinnati under Frank Duveneck, H. H. Wessel, and John Ellsworth Weiss. At the Pennsylvania Academy of Fine Arts he took a summer course and studied under Daniel Garber, Hugh Henry Breckenridge, and Joseph Thurman Pearson Jr. Myers began showing his art at the Closson Galleries about 1920. In June 1921, he went to France with John Ellsworth Weis. Myers began teaching at the Art Academy of Cincinnati where he received commissions for portraits. He taught there from 1921 to about 1941.

In 1925, he married Ella Price, a young school teacher. They spent their honeymoon in Europe, staying in Paris and Spain. The following year they made an extended trip to Colorado and California. In 1932 Myers took a sabbatical and spent a year painting in Santa Fe, New Mexico.

In 1940 Myers and his family moved to the Monterey peninsula. They lived in Pacific Grove. Myers was active in the Carmel Art Association and served as president in 1953.

Myers died of a heart attack in San Francisco, California on March 7, 1956.

== History ==
Known for his works produced with brightly colored expressive brush strokes showing his interest in French impressionism, he eventually focused on painting the coastal areas of California.

In the 1930s, his health began to falter, and he suffered bouts of depression. In 1940, he took a leave of absence, and visited Monterey, California. He was captivated by the California coastal region, and stayed there for the rest of his life. From that point on he produced, almost exclusively, seascapes of the Monterey Peninsula area.

A well-respected leader of the Carmel-Monterey art community, he served as the President of the Carmel Art Association in 1953. His painting companions included Armin Hansen and Donald Teague. Together they defined the Monterey Peninsula art scene for years to come.

== Legacy ==
His works have been widely exhibited and are in the permanent collections of many prestigious museums, including the National Museum of American Art, University of Cincinnati, Cincinnati Art Museum, New Mexico Museum of Art, San Diego Museum of Art, Canton Museum of Art, Monterey Museum of Art, The UC Irvine Langson Orange County Museum of Art, the Oakland Museum of California, and the Smithsonian American Art Museum (SAAM).

=== Listings ===
Myers is listed in:

- Artists In California: 1786-1940 (Edan Milton Hughes);
- Who Was Who In American Art 1564-1975 (Peter Hastings Falk);
- Artists of the American West: A Biographical Dictionary (Doris Ostrander Dawdy);
- Art Across America (William H. Gerdts);
- Samuels' Encyclopedia of Artists of the American West (Peggy & Harold Samuels);
- Yesterday's Artists on the Monterey Peninsula (Helen Spangenberg);
- Art & Artists of the Monterey Peninsula (Lee Harbick);
- Carmel Art Association: A History (Betty Hoag McGlynn)
- Society of Independent Artists
- AskART.com
- Carmel Art Association: Its Legends and Legacies, 1927-2007 (Dick Crispo & Lisa Crawford Watson)

== See also ==
- California Tonalism
- California Plein-Air Painting
