= Louise Lawson =

American sculptor

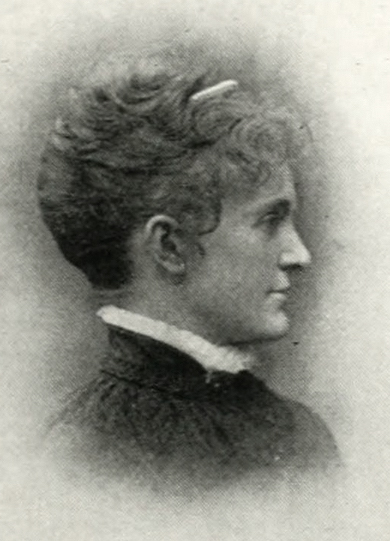
Louise Lawson, ca. 1893.

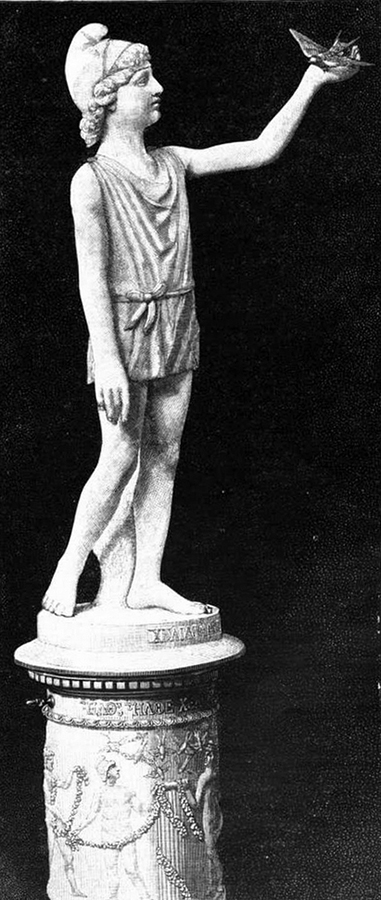
The Rhodian Boy, marble sculpture by Louise Lawson, mid 1880s.

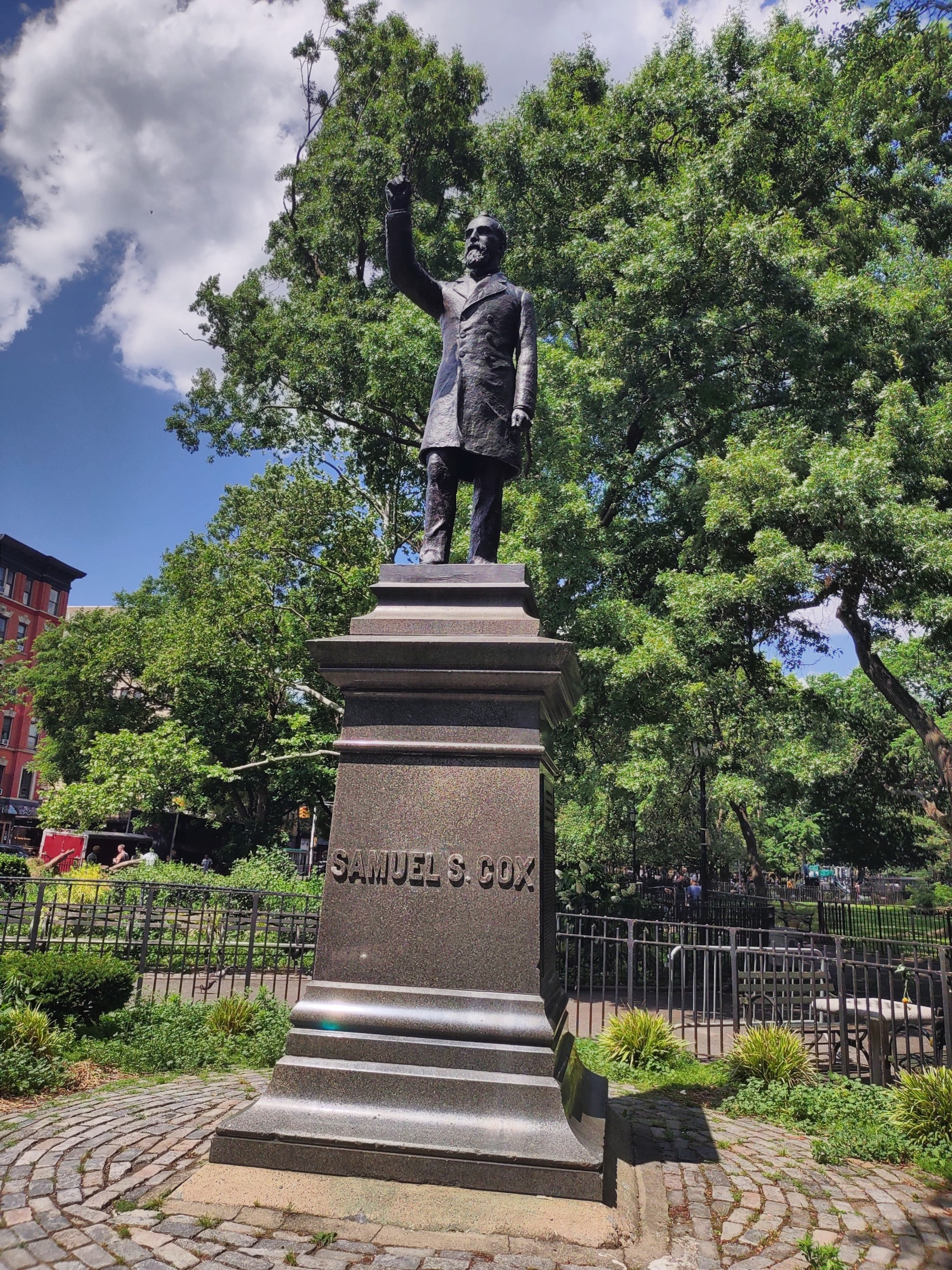
Samuel S. Cox, bronze sculpture by Louise Lawson, 1891.

Louise Lawson (1861 - April 5, 1899) was a Neoclassical sculptor and one of the first American women sculptors to have a professional career.

== Family and education ==
Louise Lawson was born in Cincinnati, Ohio, the daughter of L. M. Lawson, dean of the Medical College of Ohio. Her mother died when she was young, and her father educated her himself instead of sending her to school. She developed her interest in art early and got her art training at the Art Academy of Cincinnati with Louis Rebisso and Thomas Satterwhite Noble and then in New York at Cooper Union and with sculptor John Quincy Adams Ward. She then went abroad for three years of study in Paris with Auguste Rodin, on whose advice she went to Rome and Perugia for a further three years of study. Her first known work, Il Pastore, was made in Rome.

== Art career ==
On her return to the United States in the late 1880s, Lawson opened a sculpture studio in New York. With exhibitions and commissions beginning in the 1880s, she was one of the first American women sculptors to have a professional career. She worked in a Neoclassical style in both marble and bronze, and her sculpture was often compared to that of Harriet Hosmer, who also studied in Rome. Her career was truncated as she was still in her 30s when she died.

Her best-known work is an 1891 bronze memorial sculpture of Congressman Samuel S. Cox. Originally placed near his home on the Lower East Side, it now stands in Tompkins Square Park. It depicts Cox orating and has been criticized as a poor likeness.

Two of her marble pieces have literary origins: Ayacanora is a life-size statue of the Indian heroine of Charles Kingsley's 1855 novel Westward Ho!, while The Origin of the Harp refers to a poem of the same title by the Irish poet Thomas Moore. Another marble work, The Rhodian Boy is an homage to Classical sculpture.

In 1886, one of her marble sculptures, The Shepherd, was ruined when the ship bringing it from Italy to the United States, the French steamship Burgundia, sank after a collision with the Italian man-of-war Italia in the Bay of Naples.

A bronze relief of a fencer was installed at the New York Athletic Club in 1890.

== Notable sculptures ==
- Il Pastore (early 1880s)
- Ayacanora (mid 1880s)
- The Origin of the Harp (mid 1880s)
- The Rhodian Boy (mid 1880s)
- Samuel S. Cox (1891)
