= Charles Sprague Smith =

Founder and director of People's Institute (1853–1910)

Charles Sprague Smith

Charles Sprague Smith (1853-1910) was a Columbia University language professor who was the longtime head of the People's Institute, a civic education organization targeting immigrants organized around the Cooper Union in New York City.

== Early life and education ==
Sprague Smith was born on August 27, 1853, in Andover, Massachusetts, to Caroline L. and Charles Sprague Smith. He studied at Amherst College, graduating in 1874, and for six additional years in Europe.

== Career ==
=== Educator ===
He taught at Columbia University beginning in 1880 as a professor of Germanic languages. He then taught comparative literature and modern languages beginning in 1882 and until 1891, when his career as an educator ended due to poor health.

=== People's Institute ===
He founded and served as managing director of the People's Institute beginning in 1897. The work of the organization was focused in The Cooper Union for the Advancement of Science and Art, where Sprague Smith presided over the People's Forum that was influential within the state of New York and had a national reputation. The institute's work included a system of social and civic clubs, a bureau of civic and legislative information, and publicity of civic topics in the media.

Faith in unity and brotherhood won the confidence of the people, made possible the establishment of a school of social science where all social faiths could meet and reason together, ordered education on the basis that the life-record of every race is part of the universal human record, founded a forum, organized a church, built up a self-governing, self-supporting club, and in no instance followed precedents. These things were done because the basic principles are true. What individuals have done in a small way, here and elsewhere, through the social settlements and the manifold other expressions of the newly awakened social consciousness, in good time the world will do in a large way till the vision come true.
—Charles Sprague Smith in Working With The People

A program developed from the organization provided for more than 100,000 students and workers to attend music and theatre venues at a reduced rate. The institute was responsible for and administered the Board of Censorship of Motion Pictures. He was managing director until his death.

The People's Institute flourished after his death. For instance, John Collier worked as secretary of the People's Institute from 1907 to 1919. He developed programs for immigrant neighborhoods, emphasizing pride in their traditions, sponsoring lectures and pageants, and political awareness.

=== Other ===
He founded the Comparative Literature Society in 1895 and the Ethical - Social League to promote church and civic interests in 1907. He was organizing and managing director of the Committee of Fifteen. He wrote Working with People and Barbizon Days.

== Personal life ==
He married Isabelle Dwight on November 11, 1884, in Clinton, New York. She was an artist, teacher, and beginning in 1900, the principal of Veltin School for Girls. She was also a director of the People's Institute. They had a daughter, Hilda. They lived at 318 W. 15th Street in Manhattan, New York.

He was seriously ill with pneumonia and died on March 29 or 30 in 1910.
