= Lewis Henry Meakin =

English-American Impressionist landscape artist (1850–1917)

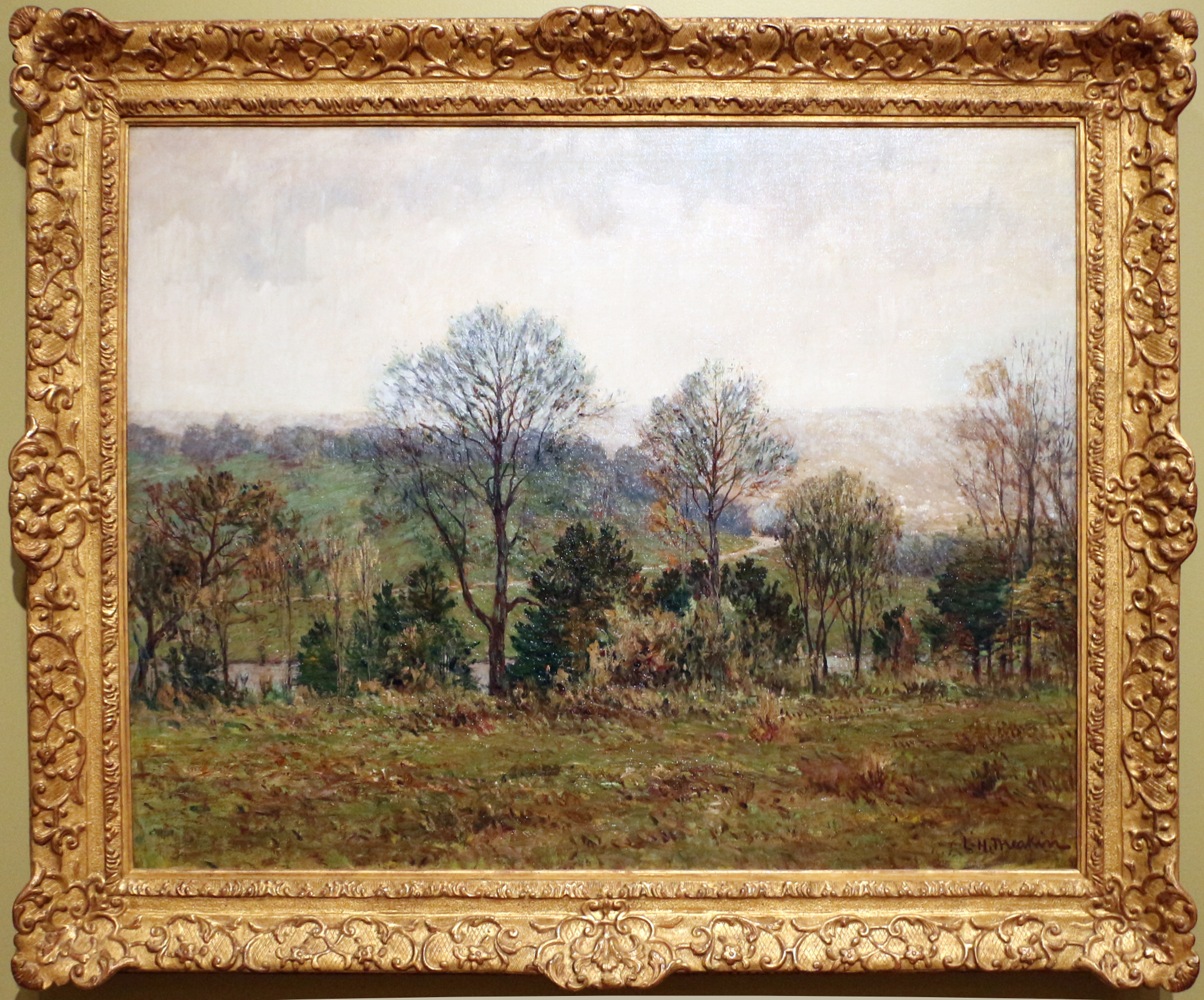
Eden Park, Cincinnati Art Museum

Lewis Henry Meakin (12 July 1850 – 15 August 1917) was an English-American Impressionist landscape artist. Born in Newcastle, England, he moved to Cincinnati, Ohio with his family in 1863. After studying art in Europe he returned to Cincinnati where he taught at the Cincinnati Art Academy. Among his students were Frances Farrand Dodge, Edna Boies Hopkins, Maud Hunt Squire, and Ethel Mars. Artist George Bellows called him “one of the best landscape painters in America."

A skilled painter of landscapes, Meakin is known for his scenes along the Ohio River, the American and Canadian Rockies, and his depictions of summer in Camden, Maine and Cape Ann, Massachusetts.

Meakin began working in a tonalist manner, then moved toward Impressionism around the turn of the century. From his travels to the American West where he pioneered the Impressionist-style for a new region, Meakin earned the title "Father of Western Art."

Meakin served as president of the Cincinnati Art Club from 1910 to 1912 as curator at the Cincinnati Art Museum from 1911 to 1917, where today some of his pieces are on exhibit. He also served as president of the Society of Western Artists.
