= Frances Farrand Dodge =

American visual artist (1878–1969)

- Born: Frances Julia Farrand; November 22, 1878; Lansing, Michigan, United States
- Died: January 12, 1969 (aged 90); Easton, Talbot, Maryland, United States
- Education: Michigan State University, Syracuse University, Art Students League of New York, Pratt Institute
- Known for: Paintings, watercolorist, illustrations
- Spouse: Arthur Charles Dodge (m. 1907–1969; her death)

Frances Julia Farrand Dodge (née Frances Julia Farrand; November 22, 1878 – January 12, 1969) was an American painter, illustrator, and teacher.

== Early life and education ==
Frances Julia Farrand was born on November 22, 1878, in Lansing, Michigan. She was the eldest of four girls. Her father, Hart Augustus Farrand (1850–1938), had a grocery store in Lansing, and her mother, Effie Ann Shank (1854–1918) was an accomplished wood carver who created much of the furniture for their home.

She studied art at the Michigan State University, Syracuse University, the Art Students League of New York, and the Pratt Institute. Among her teachers were Frank Duveneck, Lewis Henry Meakin, and Joseph Pennell.

In 1907, she married Arthur Charles Dodge (1880–1969) in Lansing, Michigan. The couple moved to Chicago, where she received specialized training in watercolor with Frederic Milton Grant (1886–1959), a student of William Merritt Chase.

== Career ==
In the 1920s Dodge lived in St. Paul, Minnesota and Ohio, (Note: The catalogue of the 115th annual exhibition of the Pennsylvania Academy of the Fine Arts of 1920 in Philadelphia, where she presented "The old Canal" (No. 354, p. 57), shows her address at No. 3 Haydock, Grandview Avenue, Cincinnati, Ohio (p. 78). The following year she contributed with "A Hill Town" (No. 158, p. 32) and her address was "Care of Fairbanks, Morse & Company, St. Paul, Minnesota" (P. 90).) where she continued studying with Herman Henry Wessel (1878–1969). In 1920 she was appointed president of the Cincinnati Art Club.

In 1921, she won the second prize in the Fine Arts Competition at the Minnesota State Fair. In 1926 and 1927 she exhibited "Danberry County Fair" and "A wood" at the Exhibitions of Etchings organized by the Chicago Society of Etchers and the Art Institute of Chicago.

She exhibited at the Art Institute of Chicago, the Pennsylvania Academy, and the National Association of Women Artists.

In 2011 the Women's Historical Center and Hall of Fame in Lansing featured works by her from their own collection in Selected Works from the Michigan Women’s Historical Center Art Collection.

In 2014 Olivet College, in Michigan included her in an exhibition of overlooked female painters titled "Beautiful Things: Still Life Paintings by American Women 1880–1940. (Note: Along Farrand Dodge's, there were paintings by others whose life experiences were similar, such as Alice Hagerman Thurber (1871 Birmingham, Michigan – 1952 Highland Park, Wayne, Michigan), Maud Miller Hoffmaster (1883 Manistee, Michigan – 1969 Traverse city, Michigan), Minnie Harms Neebe (1873 Chicago, Illinois – 1936), and Julia A. Collins Stohr (1866 Toledo, Ohio – 1947 New York).)

== Death and legacy ==
She died after a long illness on January 12, 1969, in Deep Water Point, in Easton, Maryland.

Her works can be found in private collections and at the Smithsonian American Art Museum, the Mobile Museum of Art, the University of Nebraska State Museum, the Cincinnati Art Museum, the Academy Art Museum (in Easton), and the Cincinnati Art Galleries.

== Sources ==
- "Annual Report of the Minnesota State Agricultural Society", Minnesota State Agricultural Society, 1923, p. 196
- "The MSC Record", Volume 32, Issues 1 to 12, 1926, p. 14
- R. R. Bowker: "Who's who in American Art", Volume 9, American Federation of Arts, 1953
- "The Alpha Phi Quarterly", Volume 66, Issue 2, 1954, p. 166
- "Annual Report of the Board of Regents of the Smithsonian Institution", Smithsonian Institution, 1959, p. 99
- Bell Shank Farrand Rahn: "Childhood Memoirs by the Four Farrand Girls" and "The Farrand House", 1961.
- "Tidewater Times" Vol. 10 No. 10, March 1966.
- Robert L. Crump: "Minnesota Prints and printmakers 1900–1945" p. 82, Ed. Minnesota Historical Society Press, 2009.
- Julie Aronson, Anita J. Ellis, Jennifer Howe: "The Cincinnati Wing: The Story of Art in the Queen City", 2003, P. 210
