= Louise Veltin =

American school principal (1856–1934)

Louise Veltin (January 8, 1856 - January 7, 1934) was the principal of the Veltin School for Girls in New York.

She was born in Paris on January 8, 1856; her parents were Captain Christian Veltin and Henriette de Launay Veltin. Her father died fighting Native Americans in New Mexico.

In 1886 she started the Veltin School for Girls, at 175 West 73rd St in New York; she moved it to 160 West 74th Street in 1892, where it stayed until it closed in 1924.

She was awarded the Medaille de la Reconnaissance Francaise for her relief work in World War I.
