= Ogden, Ohio =

Unincorporated community in Ohio, U.S.

Coordinates: 39°25′51″N 83°54′41″W

Ogden is an unincorporated community in Adams Township, Clinton County, Ohio, United States.

== History ==
Ogden had its start in the 1850s when the Cincinnati & Muskingum Valley Railroad was extended to that point. The community was named after Ogden, Utah. A post office called Ogden was established in 1865, and remained in operation until 1913.

== Gallery ==
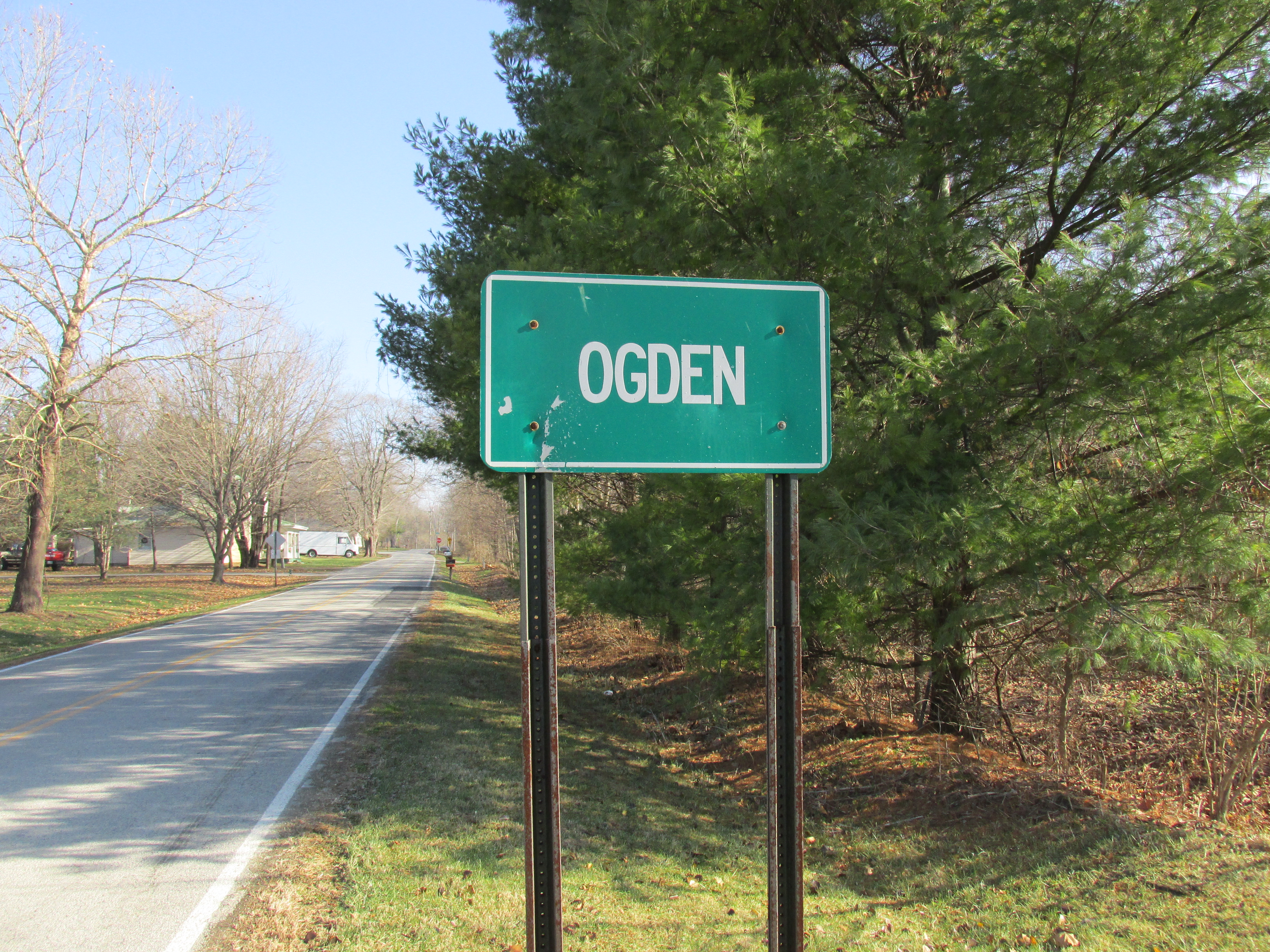
Ogden community sign

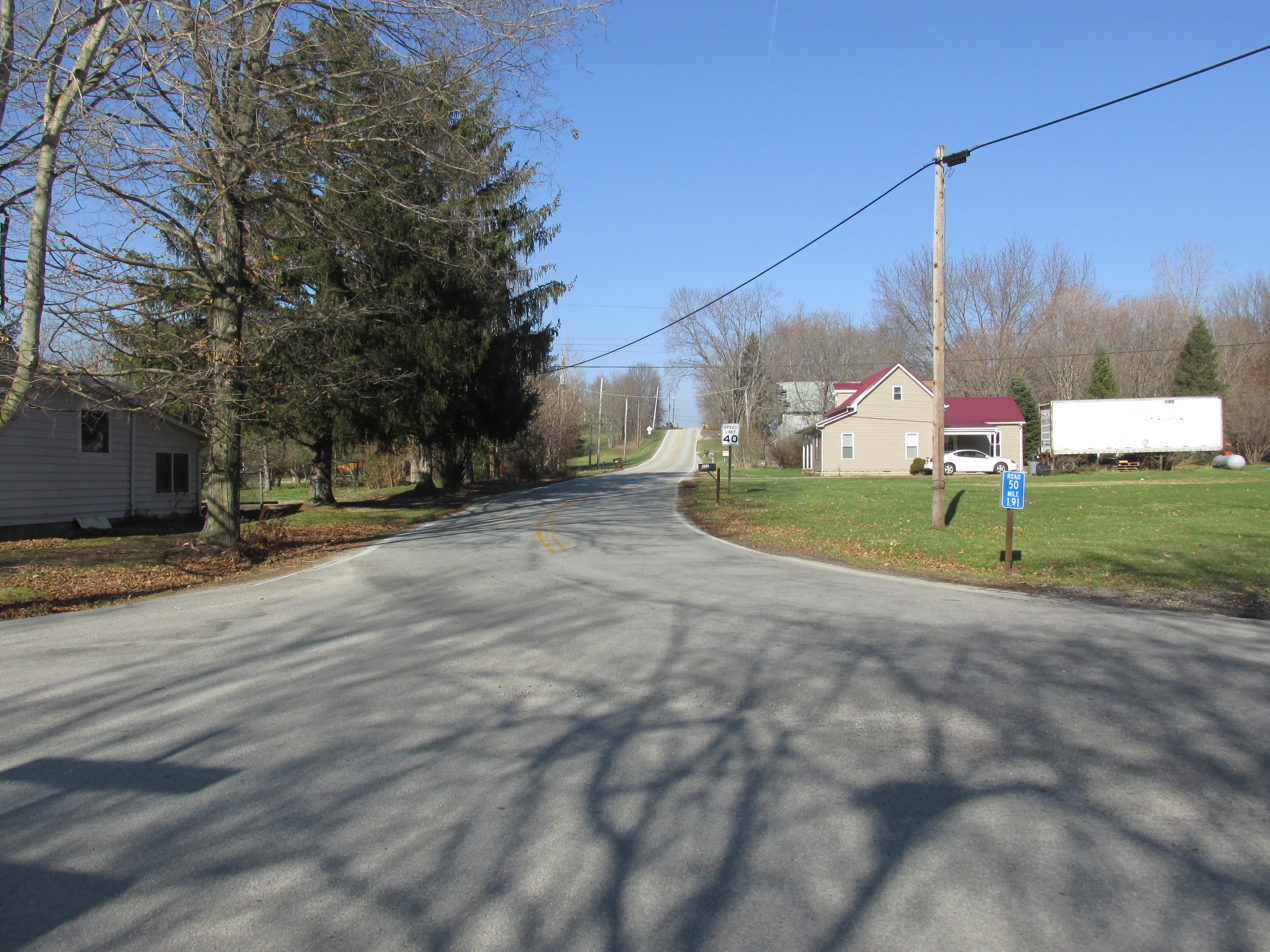
Looking north at the junction of Ogden and Beechgrove Roads in Ogden
