= Noel Martin =

American graphic designer

- Noel Martin at work, 1971
- Born: April 19, 1922; Syracuse, Ohio
- Died: February 23, 2009 (aged 86)
- Education: Art Academy of Cincinnati
- Occupation: Graphic designer

Noel Martin (April 19, 1922 – February 23, 2009) was an American graphic designer.

== Biography ==
Noel Martin was born on April 19, 1922, in Syracuse, Ohio, and moved to Cincinnati when he was a boy. In the 1940s, he studied drawing, painting, and printmaking at the Art Academy of Cincinnati, where he later became an instructor. His education was interrupted by World War II, when he spent time in the Air Force working in camouflage. He was self-taught in typography and design, which were his main activities for the bulk of his career.

Martin worked as a freelance graphic designer and art director. His clients included Champion Papers, Federated Department Stores, Xomox Corporation, Dreyfus Corporation, The New Republic magazine, Hebrew Union College, and many other industrial, educational, and cultural organizations. In 1947, he became the first graphic designer for the Cincinnati Art Museum. In that role, he worked on the museum's first logo, graphics, installations, and put him at the forefront of the movement to simplify and remove the clutter from catalogs of all varieties—from industrial parts catalogs to art museum catalogs.

Later, he taught at the Art Academy of Cincinnati and was adjunct professor at the University of Cincinnati, and he had major one-man exhibitions in the United States and Canada. His work was included in the exhibition, "Four American Designers", at the Museum of Modern Art, New York City, in 1953, and in a one-man exhibition at the American Institute of Graphic Arts in 1958. In 1971, he was the first Cincinnati artist to exhibit at the Contemporary Arts Center after its relocation in 1970, where he exhibited geometric paintings.

Foreign exhibitions have included those of the U.S. Information Agency in Europe, Latin America, and the U.S.S.R., and also at the Gutenberg Museum, Mainz; Musee d'Art Moderne, Paris; and the Grafiska Institute, Stockholm. Martin's work is represented in public collections in New York, Boston, Washington, Cincinnati, and Amsterdam.

He lectured at the Smithsonian, the Library of Congress, Aspen Design Conference, and schools and organizations throughout the country. Among his awards are the Art Directors Medal, Philadelphia, 1957, and the Sachs Award, Cincinnati, 1973.

== Death and legacy ==
Martin died of leukemia on February 23, 2009. His archive is housed at the University of Cincinnati.
