= Laura I. Mattoon =

American recreation professional

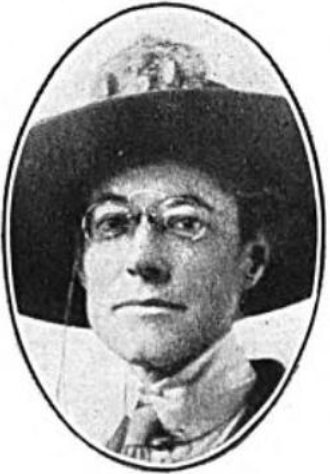
- Mattoon from a 1922 publication
- Born: July 28, 1871; Springfield, Massachusetts, U.S.
- Died: March 6, 1946 (aged 74); Wolfeboro, New Hampshire, U.S.
- Occupations: Educator, recreation professional

Laura Isabelle Mattoon (July 28, 1871 – March 6, 1946) was an American educator and recreation professional. She founded one of the first American summer camps for girls, Camp Kehonka, in 1902. From 1904 to 1939 she was executive secretary of the Camp Directors Association of America.

== Early life and education ==
Mattoon was born in Springfield, Massachusetts, the daughter of William Peter Mattoon and Laura Ann Goodnow Mattoon. Her father was a stockbroker. Her paternal grandfather William Mattoon was a railroad engineer, for whom Mattoon, Illinois, was named. She graduated from Wellesley College in 1894, and was a founding member of the Wellesley College Bicycle Club. She pursued further studies at Smith College and Teachers College, Columbia University.

== Career ==
Mattoon was head of science at the Veltin School for Girls in New York City. In 1902, she started Camp Kehonka, one of the first American summer camps for girls, along Lake Winnepesaukee in New Hampshire. She a founding member of the National Association of Directors of Girls' Camps, and helped to organize the first "nature-lore school" for camp counselors in 1920. In 1924 she was elected to the national leadership of the Camp Directors Association of America, and served the association as executive secretary for 15 years. She was associate editor of The Camping Magazine.

In 1909, she traveled to Labrador. In 1912, Mattoon and Florence Du Bois Rees traveled to Palestine. They landed at Jaffa, visited Jericho and Hebron, traveled by horseback to a Bedouin camp near the Dead Sea, and stayed with Rees's brother-in-law, diplomat William Coffin, in Jerusalem. They also attended a Christmas mass in Bethlehem.

== Publications ==
- Camper’s Guidance Manual
- Services for the Open (1923, with Helen Dalton Bragdon)

== Personal life ==
Mattoon lived in New Hampshire full-time, sharing a household with the camp dietitian Alice Crane and camp director A. Cooper Ballentine. She died in 1946, at the age of 74, in Wolfeboro, New Hampshire. She left the camp to Ballentine, who died in 1984, and Camp Kehonka's last camping season was in 1985.
