= MacDowell residency =

Arts residency in Peterborough, New Hampshire

Coordinates: 42°53′24″N 71°57′18″W

- MacDowell Colony
- U.S. National Register of Historic Places
- U.S. National Historic Landmark District
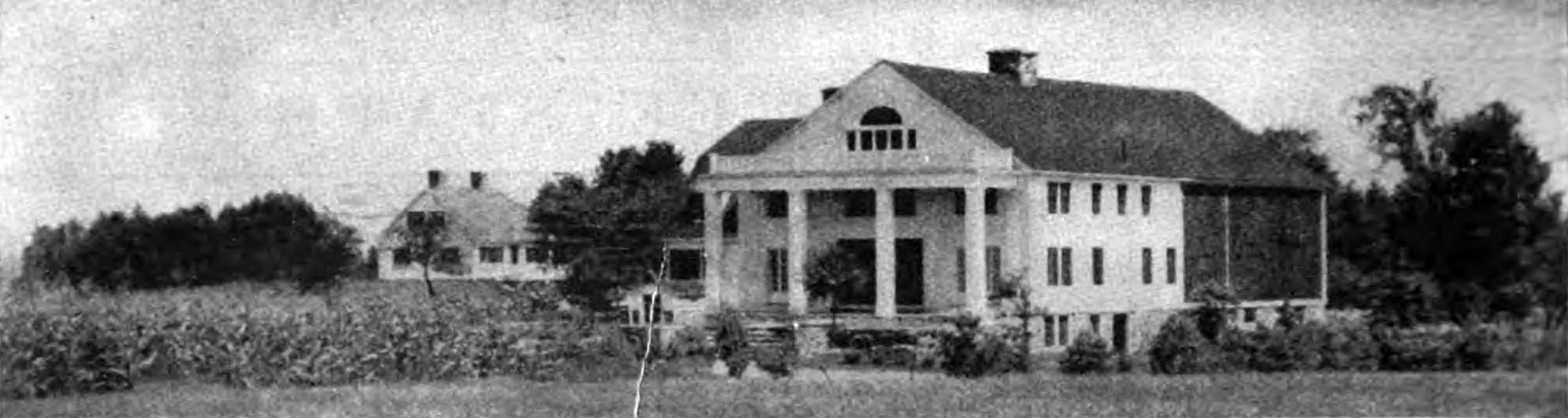
- Colony Hall and Sigma Alpha Iota Cottage

- Location within New Hampshire Location within the United States
- Location: 100 High Street, Peterborough, New Hampshire, U.S.
- Built: 1907
- NRHP reference No.: 66000026

Significant dates
- Added to NRHP: October 15, 1966
- Designated NHLD: December 29, 1962

MacDowell is an artist's residency program in Peterborough, New Hampshire. The program was founded in 1907 by composer Edward MacDowell and his wife, pianist and philanthropist Marian MacDowell. Prior to July 2020, it was known as the MacDowell Colony or "The Colony", but its board of directors shortened the name to remove "terminology with oppressive overtones".

After Edward MacDowell died in 1908, Marian MacDowell established the artists' residency program through a nonprofit association in honor of her husband, raising funds to transform her farm into a quiet retreat for creative artists to work. She led the organization for almost 25 years.

Over the years, an estimated 9,000 artists have been supported in residence with nearly 16,000 fellowships, including the winners of at least 102 Pulitzer Prizes, 33 National Book Awards, 31 Tony Awards, 34 MacArthur Fellowships, 18 Grammys, 9 Oscars, 969 Guggenheim Fellowships, and 122 Rome Prizes. The artists' residency program has accepted visual and interdisciplinary artists, architects, filmmakers, composers, playwrights, poets, and writers, both well-known and unknown. Since January 2020, Nell Painter has served as chair of MacDowell, the first woman to hold the position. In February 2023, Chiwoniso Kaitano was appointed MacDowell's executive director, the first Black person to serve in the role.

== History ==
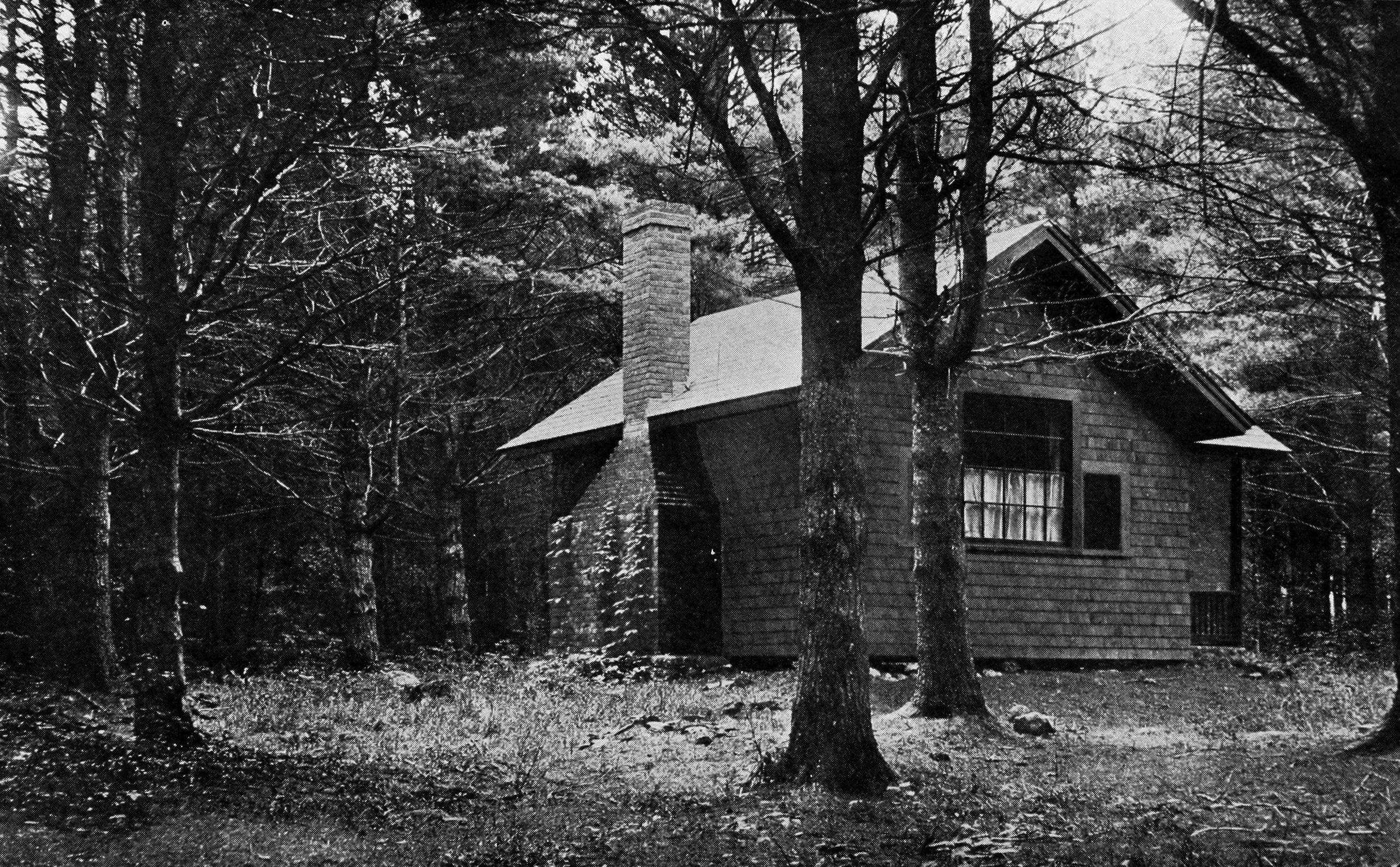
Star Studio at MacDowell, donated by Alpha Chi Omega Fraternity

In 1896, pianist Marian MacDowell bought Hillcrest Farm in Peterborough, New Hampshire, as a summer residence for herself and her husband, composer Edward MacDowell. She had always been careful to give him a quiet room for his work. They found that the New Hampshire landscape enhanced his work of composing music.

The couple formulated a plan to provide an interdisciplinary experience in a nurturing landscape, by creating an institutionalized residential art colony in the area. In 1904, Edward MacDowell began to show signs of an illness that ended his composing and teaching career. He died in 1908.

In 1907, Marian MacDowell deeded their farm to the Edward MacDowell Association and founded the MacDowell Colony. The first guests arrived that year: sisters Helen Farnsworth Mears, a sculptor, and Mary Mears, a writer. Mears wrote about her time on site for The Craftsman in July 1909. MacDowell began by inviting applicants personally, but by the 1920s had consigned the admission process to a committee.

Marian and friends raised funds and found support from industrialist and philanthropist Andrew Carnegie, former U.S. President Grover Cleveland, financier J. P. Morgan, other prominent people, as well as many others across the country. MacDowell said the most consistent support came from women's clubs and professional music sororities (see, for example, the MacDowell Club of New York). At the age of 50, MacDowell began lecturing to women's groups to raise funds, resumed her performing career, and became a noted interpreter of her husband's work.

Elizabeth Sprague Coolidge organized an effort in 1916 to build and name a studio at MacDowell in memory of her teacher Regina Watson. It was renovated in 1993 and became McDowell's first barrier-free studio that was accessible to everyone.

By 1918, 31 of Isabelle Sprague Smith's students funded the creation of the Isabelle D. Sprague Smith studio. Through the years more separate studios were built. The program continues in 32 studios scattered over 450 acres (1.8 km^{2}) of land.

On March 13, 2020, MacDowell shut in the face of the COVID-19 outbreak and sent artists and fellows home. It was the first time the site had shut since the 1938 New England hurricane. MacDowell reopened its doors in October of 2020.

== Medal Day ==
Every year, MacDowell presents the Edward MacDowell Medal to an artist who has made a significant cultural contribution. Residency at MacDowell is not a requirement. Medal Day is one of the rare occasions when the site is open to the public. The ceremony includes a keynote speech, after which the artists open their studios to visitors.

== Property tax dispute ==
MacDowell, a non-profit organization, enjoys the status of a charity, entitling it to exemption from local property taxes, among other things. However, in 2005, the town of Peterborough's selectmen (local-government executives) decided to challenge MacDowell's charitable status and billed the organization for a "payment in lieu of taxes". A lawyer for the town argued that "the Colony certainly benefits its artists-in-residence, but that doesn't strike us as being the general public."

The then-Board of Directors paid the bill, then successfully challenged the charge. A 2007 Superior Court opinion found that the MacDowell Colony, by promoting the arts, was a charitable institution, a ruling that was upheld by the New Hampshire Supreme Court in a subsequent appeal. The appeal court found that "Contrary to the Town's assertions, MacDowell's articles of incorporation oblige it to use its property for its stated charitable purpose."

== Awards ==
In 1962, the site and buildings were designated a National Historic Landmark District.

In 1997, MacDowell Colony was awarded the National Medal of Arts.

== Notable works ==
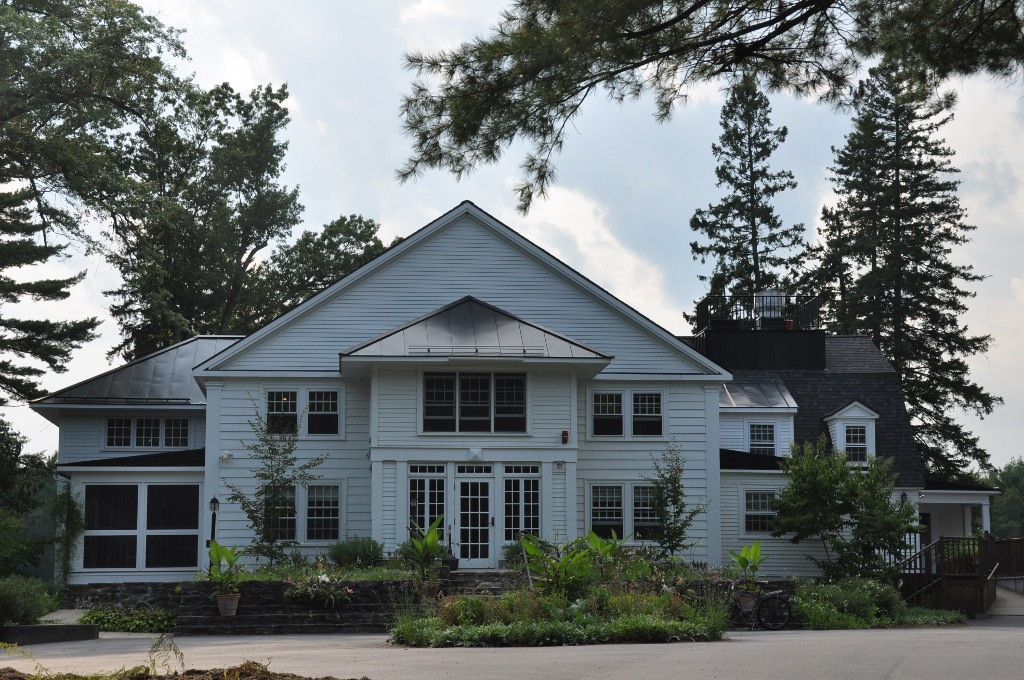
Bond Hall in 2012

Notable works written, in whole or in part, by their authors at MacDowell include:

- Leonard Bernstein completed his Mass.
- James Baldwin worked on Giovanni's Room and Another Country.
- Willa Cather wrote parts of Death Comes for the Archbishop.
- Michael Chabon wrote The Amazing Adventures of Kavalier & Clay, a 2001 Pulitzer winner. Chabon served as chairman of the board from 2010 to 2020.
- Aaron Copland worked there on composing the orchestral suite Appalachian Spring (1944), a 1945 Pulitzer winner.
- Jonathan Franzen completed The Corrections.
- Spalding Gray worked on his novel The Impossible Vacation, and later chronicled his experiences in his extended monologue Monster in a Box.
- DuBose Heyward and Dorothy Heyward wrote Porgy and Bess.
- Helen Hooven Santmyer wrote Farewell, Summer in 1930 (published posthumously)
- Virgil Thomson worked on The Mother of Us All.
- Alice Walker worked on her first novel and Meridian.
- Joan Wickersham wrote her 2008 memoir The Suicide Index: Putting My Father's Death in Order, the work would later become a finalist for the National Book Award
- Thornton Wilder wrote Our Town and The Bridge of San Luis Rey.
- Tommy Orange worked on his debut There There and on his second novel Wandering Stars as an MacDowell fellow.

== See also ==
- List of National Historic Landmarks in New Hampshire
- National Register of Historic Places listings in Hillsborough County, New Hampshire
- New Hampshire Historical Marker No. 206: The MacDowell Graves
