= Tomb Effigy of Elizabeth Boott Duveneck =

Sculpted tomb dedicated to Elizabeth Boott Duveneck

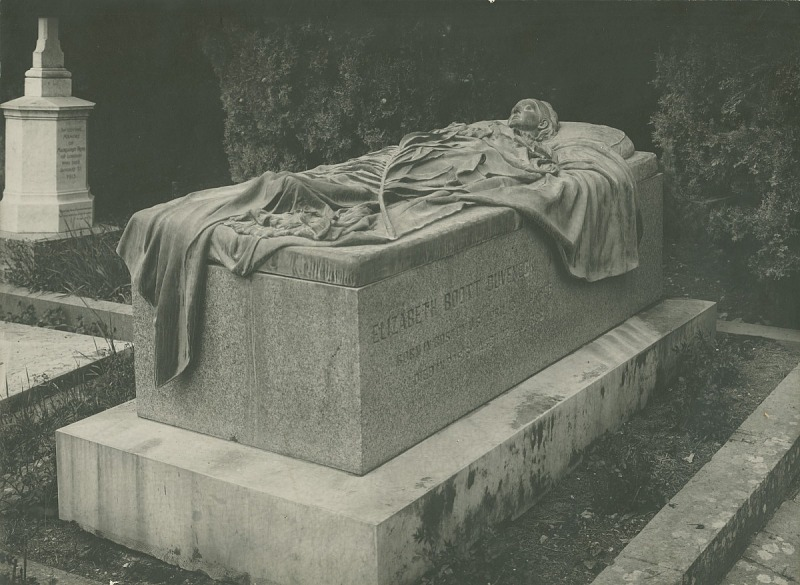
- Artist: Frank Duveneck, Clement Barnhorn
- Year: Completed 1891
- Type: Bronze, gold leaf
- Dimensions: 167 cm × 104 cm × 215.9 cm (66 in × 41 in × 85.0 in)
- Location: Cimitero degli Allori, Florence, Italy

The Tomb Effigy of Elizabeth Boott Duveneck is a funerary monument completed in 1891 by the American artist Frank Duveneck. It was constructed for the grave of his wife Elizabeth Boott Duveneck, (known as Lizzie (1846–1888), also an artist) at the Cimitero degli Allori, outside Florence, Italy. Although primarily a painter, Frank Duveneck produced a number of sculptures, assisted in their design by the sculptor Clement Barnhorn.

The couple married relatively late when they were both around 40 years old. She came from a wealthy Boston family, while he had a middle-class Kentucky background. Although neither her father nor her friends (including Henry James) approved of the marriage, the couple were devoted to each other. Lizzie's early death four years after their marriage left Duveneck distraught. In commemoration, he co-designed and sculpted this highly expressive monument, which is widely considered a high point of 19th-century funerary art.

The effigy is made from bronze and gold leaf and is life-sized at 215.9 cm (85.0 in) in length. A 1927 copy is in the Metropolitan Museum of Art, New York.

== Elizabeth Boott ==
Elizabeth Boott, known as Lizzie, was an American painter of landscapes, portraits and still life. She was born into a wealthy family in Boston; her father was the successful composer Francis Boott. Elizabeth married Frank Duveneck (her former teacher) in 1886 when she was just over 40 years old, much to the disapproval of her father, who viewed Duveneck as a coarse and unrefined bohemian. She had been raised in a wealthy family and was a long-term friend of the author Henry James, who also looked down on Duveneck.

The couple moved to a villa in Bellosguardo in southwestern Italy, where they had a son together. However, she caught pneumonia and died on March 22, 1888. Her death left her husband grief-stricken and distraught. He was 38 years old when they married, while she had just passed 40 years. She described him as the love of her life. Duveneck did not remarry after Lizzie's death and died in 1919 at the age of 70.

== Description ==
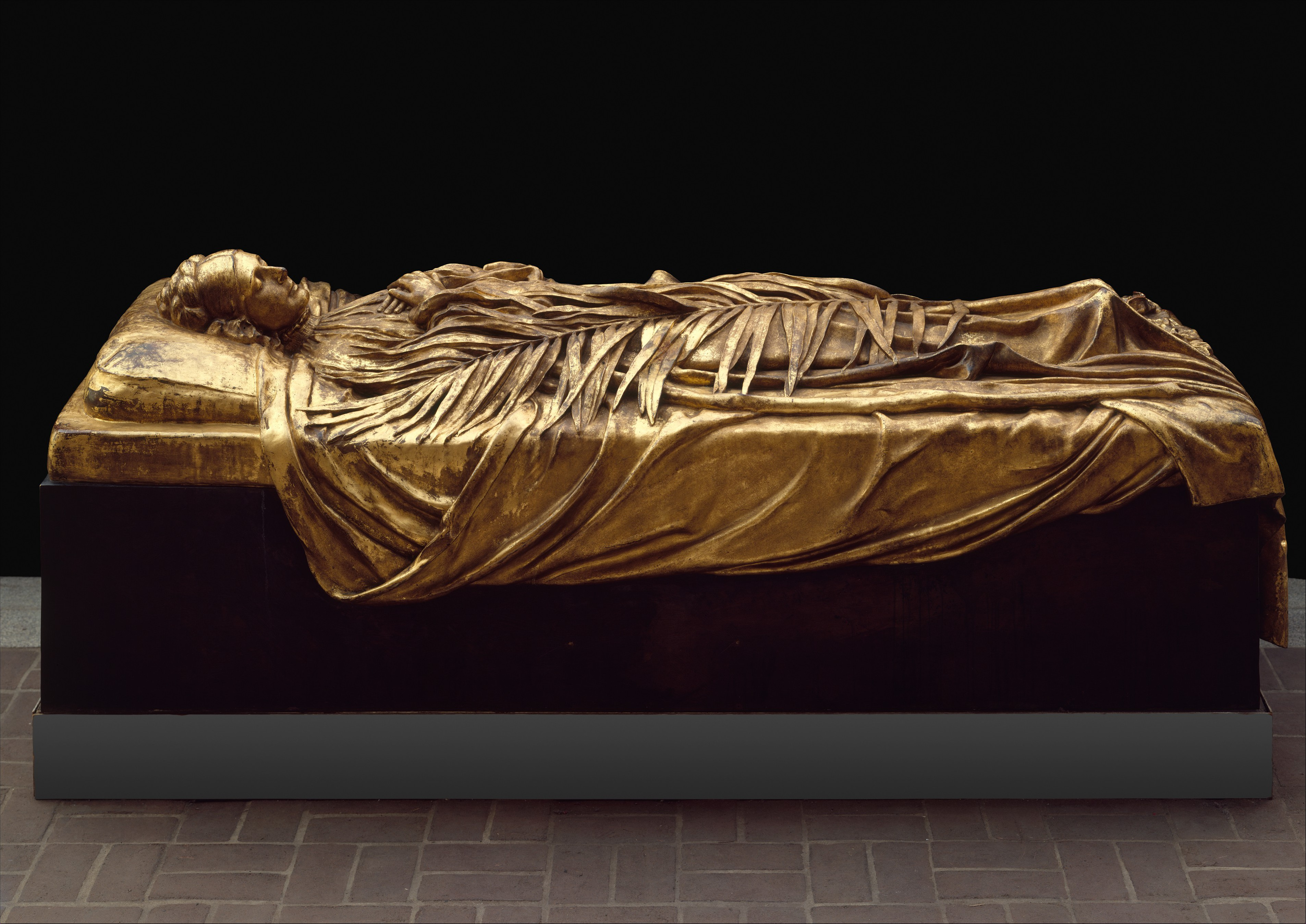
Replica completed in 1927, now in the Metropolitan Museum of Art, New York

The monument's design incorporates elements from both Gothic and Renaissance recumbent effigies, coupled with a 19th-century outlook on death. She is shown as resting peacefully with her arms folded over her chest. The dominant feature is the ribbed and expressive palm branch strewn across her body, which art historians interpret as representing the optimistic Christian belief that death is temporary rather than eternal.

The tomb is widely admired, and although a painter rather than sculptor, Duveneck produced a number of copies for major American museums, such as the bronze or plaster copies in the Metropolitan Museum of Art, New York, the Museum of Fine Arts, Boston, the Art Institute of Chicago, the Yale University Art Gallery, the University of Nebraska and the Pennsylvania Academy of Fine Arts.

The original plaster copy is in the Cincinnati Art Museum, Ohio.

== See also ==
- Veiled Christ, a 1753 marble tomb effigy by Giuseppe Sanmartino

== Sources ==
- Gardner, Albert Ten Eyck. American Sculpture: A Catalogue of the Collection of the Metropolitan Museum of Art. Metropolitan Museum of Art, 1965
- Jaffe, Irma (ed.). The Italian Presence in American Art, 1860-1920 NY: Fordham University Press, 1992. ISBN 978-0-8232-1342-9
- Marshall, Christopher (ed.). Sculpture and the Museum. Routledge, 2017. ISBN 978-1-3515-4955-4
- Tolles, Thayer (ed.). American Sculpture in the Metropolitan Museum of Art, Volume I: A Catalogue of Works by Artists Born before 1865 Archived 2023-07-08 at the Wayback Machine. New York: Metropolitan Museum of Art, 1999
- Young, Mahonri Sharp. "The Two Worlds of Frank Duveneck". The American Art Journal, volume 1, No. 1, Spring 1969. JSTOR 1593857
