= Willis Seaver Adams =

American painter

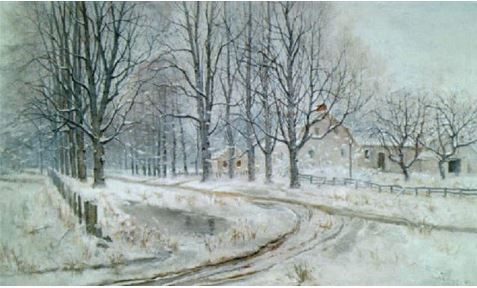
Feather Street, Suffield, Connecticut

Willis Seaver Adams (1842–1921) was a landscape painter who studied under James Abbott McNeill Whistler. He studied at the Royal Academy of Fine Arts in Antwerp, Belgium and was part of the Tonalism movement, which took place in the late 19th century.

== Biography ==
=== Early life ===
Willis Seaver Adams was born in Suffield, Connecticut, in 1844. His father was Stephen Lorenzo Adams, also known as Pole Adams; his mother was Susan Adams. His father was a farmer and operated a tavern out of the house located by the Enfield and Suffield Covered bridge over the Connecticut River. In Willis' childhood, his father attempted to make him a farmer and a school master yet failed due to Willis' dreams to be involved with art. From 1857 to 1862 Adams sporadically attended the Connecticut Literary Institute, now known as Suffield Academy. While at the school Adams filled his books with sketches of animals and the people around him.

While working at a drug store in Springfield, a wealthy Springfield doctor named Dr. Holmes privately funded Adams to attend the Royal Academy in Antwerp in 1868, but Adams was forced to return to Springfield when his sponsor died soon after.

=== Artistic career ===
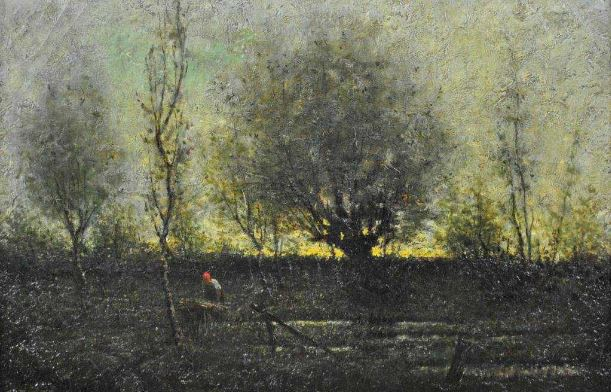
Morning in Bavaria

Willis Seaver Adams traveled to Cleveland, Ohio, for a two-week vacation that extended into a two-year residence (1876–78) where he met some other young, upcoming artists, Otto Henry Bacher and Sion Longley Wenban. He was a member of the Cleveland Art Club and the Cleveland Academy of Fine Arts. He also painted a portrait of then governor and later president Rutherford B. Hayes. During his time in Cleveland, Adams avoided capturing industrial motifs in his paintings or scenes depicting modern advances of 19th century life, which led to his naturalist ideology; he also developed an interest in spiritualism.

In 1878, Adams traveled to Europe with Otto Bacher and became one of the "Duveneck Boys," a young group of American artists studying with Frank Duveneck. He was friends with James Abbott McNeill Whistler in Venice, Italy.

When he returned from Europe, Adams began a long association with James D. Gill, at whose galleries Adams exhibited often. Adams eventually settled in the Connecticut River Valley and devoted his later years to oil miniatures as well as landscapes of Connecticut River Valley scenes. These landscapes reflect Whistler's influence. Adams often used a reduced pallette and avoided detail with the aim of capturing an atmosphere and mood.

== Legacy ==
Adams' painting can be located today at Suffield Academy, Kent Memorial Library in Suffield, The Wadsworth Atheneum, Mount Holyoke College and Smith College. In 1966, Deerfield Academy organized a retrospective exhibit.
