= Clement Barnhorn =

American sculptor (1857–1935)

Clement John Barnhorn (1857–1935) was an American sculptor and educator known for his memorials, architectural sculpture, and ecclesiastic and funerary works.

== Early years ==
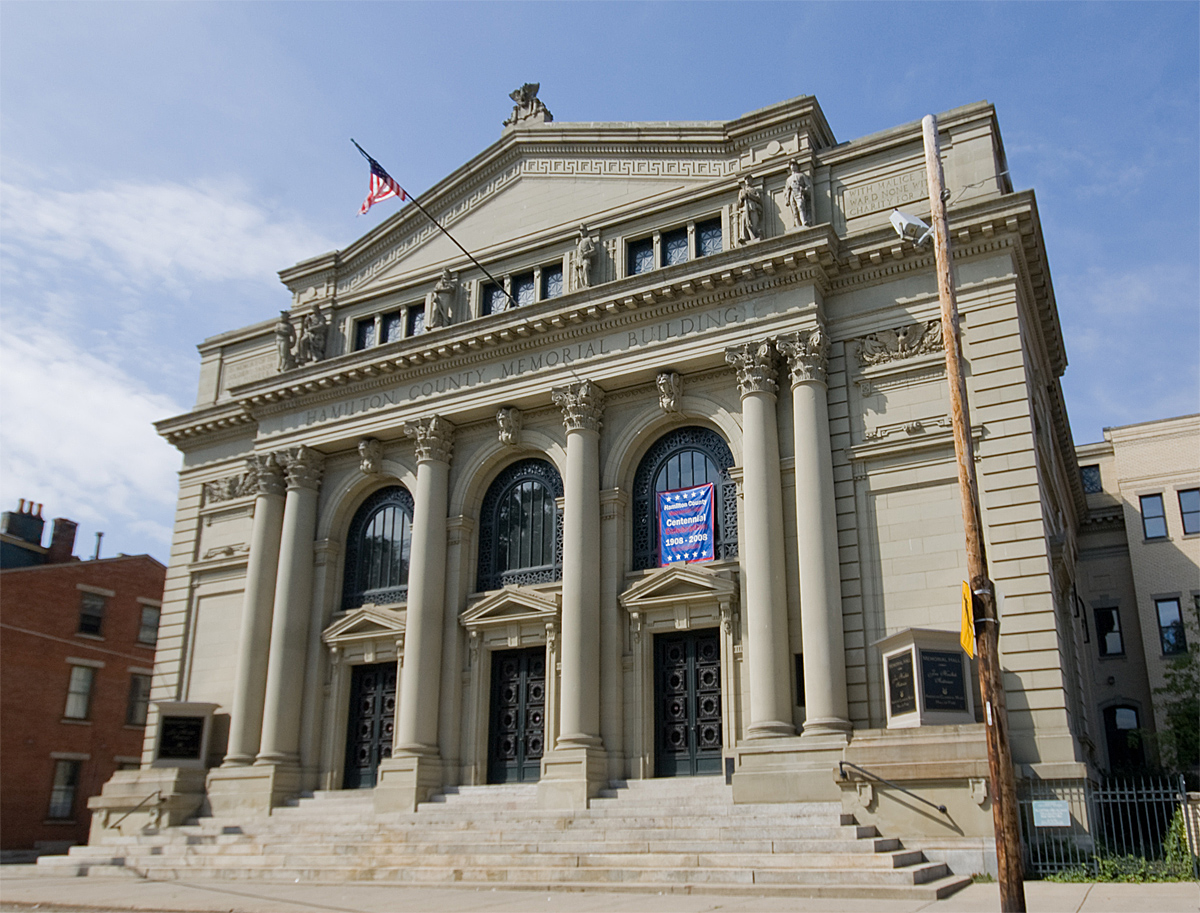
Attic figures, Hamilton County Memorial Building

Born in Cincinnati, Ohio, Barnhorn began his art studies at the Art Academy of Cincinnati where he studied under Italian sculptor Lewis T. Rebisso and woodcarver Henry L. Fry. This was followed by studies in Paris at the Académie Julian under Bouguereau, Peuch and Mercié.

Barnhorn's sculptures were executed in stone or metal, or in ceramic faience for Rookwood Pottery. His "Magdalen" received Honorable Mention at the Paris Salon in 1895, and bronze at the Paris Exposition in 1900. He also won medals at the Pan-American Exposition in Buffalo in 1901 and the Louisiana Purchase Exposition in St. Louis in 1904.

Barnhorn returned to teach at the Art Academy in 1900 to succeed his mentor, Rebisso, who had died. He served as head of the academy's sculpture department, and as the Art Museum's honorary curator of sculpture, positions he held until his death in 1935.

His relationship with Frank Duveneck went beyond friendship. Barnhorn invited Duveneck to his Pike Street studio and provided tools and guidance in the memorial sculpture to Duveneck's wife (1891). The two shared the third-floor studio space in the Art Museum, and collaborated on several pieces. Barnhorn created the memorial for Duveneck (1924-1925) on his tomb in Mother of God Cemetery in Covington.

A remarkable number of Barnhorn's works can be found around Cincinnati. Barnhorn was a renowned ecclesiastic sculptor, noted for "Madonna and Child" and "The Assumption of Mary into Heaven" at the Cathedral Basilica of the Assumption in Covington, Kentucky, and the "Crucifixion Group" at St. Monica-St. George Church in University Heights. He assisted Rebisso on the William Henry Harrison statue in Piatt Park, and carved the soldier statues on the frieze above Memorial Hall.

He won medals at both the Pan-American Exposition in Buffalo in 1901 and at the Louisiana Purchase Exposition in St Louis in 1904.

Barnhorn was a member of the National Sculpture Society and exhibited a work, Madonna, at their 1923 exhibition.

== Selected works ==
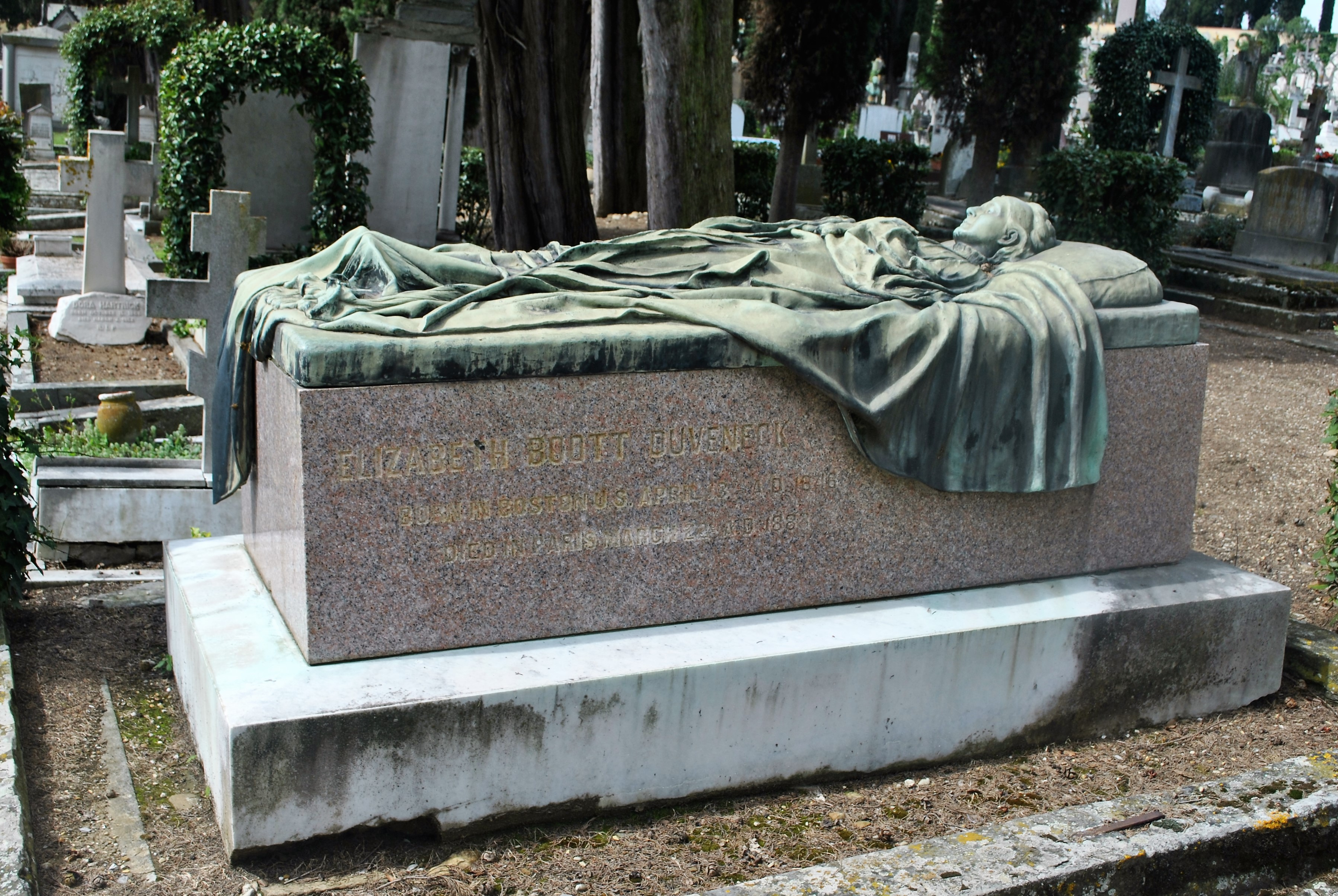
Cimitero degli Allori, Elizabeth Boott

- Memorial to Elizabeth Boott Duveneck, Allori Cemetery, Florence, Italy 1891

This work was created for the wife of American artist Frank Duveneck

- Ralph Waldo Emerson, Cincinnati Art Museum, Cincinnati, Ohio 1905
- Veteran's Memorial Statuary, Hamilton County Memorial Building, Cincinnati, Ohio 1908
- Crucifixion Scene, Mother of God Cemetery, Covington, Kentucky, 1915

Barnhorn's memorial to his friend Frank Duveneck is in the same cemetery.
