= Francis Boott (composer) =

American composer

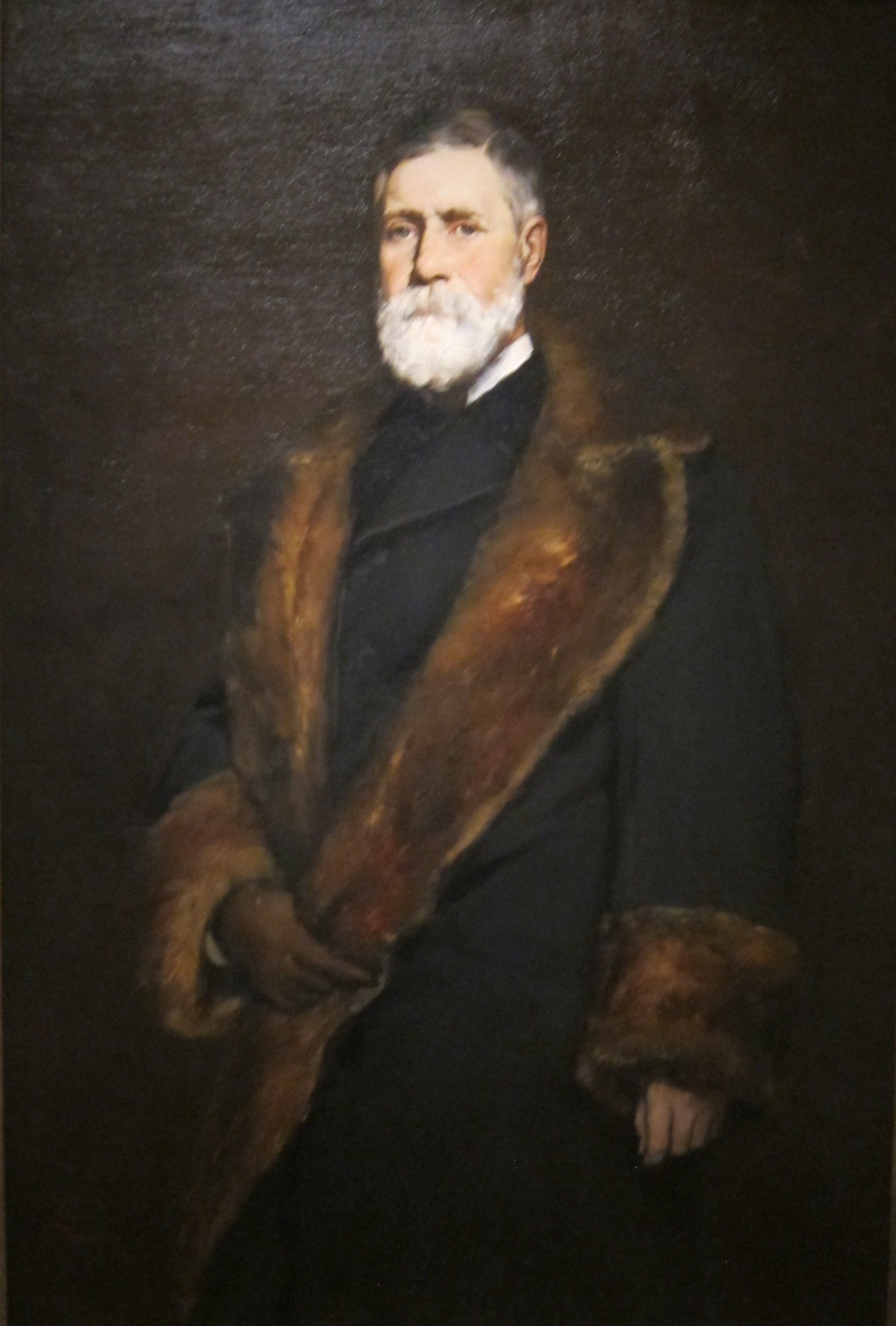
Francis Boott by Frank Duveneck, Cincinnati Art Museum

Francis Boott (June 24, 1813 in Boston, Massachusetts – March 1, 1904 in Cambridge, Massachusetts) was an American classical music composer of art songs and works for chorus.

== Biography ==
Boott was born of British parentage. He was educated at Samuel and Sarah Ripley's school in Waltham, where Ralph Waldo Emerson was one of the tutors, and at Round Hill School, followed by Harvard College from which he graduated in 1831. In the 1850s, following the death of his wife, Boott took his young daughter Elizabeth (Lizzie) (1846–88) to Florence, Italy, where he studied harmony with Luigi Picchianti.

Boott became an honorary professor at the Academy of Fine Arts. He was friends with others in the Anglophone community in Florence, including Henry and William James, the Brownings, Isa Blagden and Constance Fenimore Woolson. Francis Boott and his daughter Lizzie Boott lived at the Villa Castellani in the Bellosguardo heights. Lizzie became a painter, and married the painter Frank Duveneck, who went to live with her and her father in the villa. The novelist Henry James visited them there and used the villa as a model for Italian villas in his Roderick Hudson and The Portrait of a Lady.

In 1888 Boott returned to America, and continued to compose music.

He died on 1 March 1904 at the age of 90 in Cambridge, Massachusetts.

Boott bequeathed $10,000 to Harvard University as a prize fund for the best 4-part vocal work written by a Harvard student. In 1960 the amount was increased to $15,246 through capital gains. The prize continues to be awarded by the Harvard University Department of Music.

== Music ==
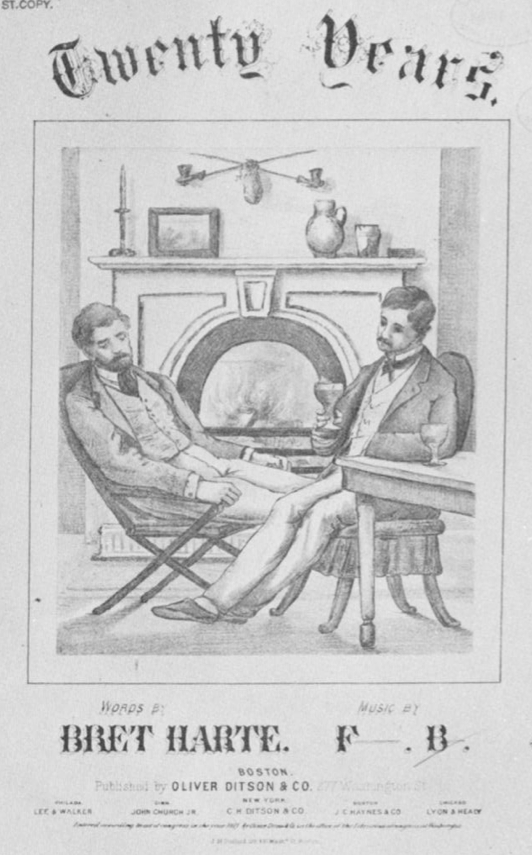
Twenty Years. Words by Bret Harte, music by F-. B-. [Francis Boott]. Boston, Oliver Ditson & Co., 1871

Boott's first six songs appeared in 1846 under the pen name of Telford; Upton described them as "quite undistinguished". In 1857 eight songs were published, followed by many individual songs in the following years. Boott composed at least 140 songs during his long life, as well as a handful of duets, choral works, part-songs, and instrumental works. He also composed hymns for church services, many of which were included in the hymnal for King's Chapel in Boston.

While his melodies and piano accompaniments are considered "commonplace, with little harmonic interest", his choices of texts were sophisticated, embracing the literary world of his time. In 1857 John Sullivan Dwight wrote that his songs are "not strikingly original, but graceful and facile, much to be preferred to the popular sweetish, sentimental type".

== Musical compositions ==
Songs for voice and piano

under the pseudonym Telford:

- Six Songs, 1846, G. P. Reed Publishing
1. The Convict's Lullaby (Henry Kirke White); revised 1874, S. Brainard's Sons, publisher
2. It is O'er (Mrs. Jameson)
3. Lass of Northmaven (from The Pirate)
4. Byron's Farewell (Lord Byron)
5. Tirana Española; revised 1874, S. Brainard's Sons, publisher
6. My Home and Thee
- The Blind Man's Bride (Ballad) (Caroline Sheridan Norton), G. P. Reed, 1846; revised 1874, S. Brainard's Sons, publisher
- Cleveland's Farewell (Sir Walter Scott), G. P. Reed, 1846

under his own name

- Florence, 8 songs, Oliver Ditson, 1857
1. Sands o' Dee (Charles Kingsley)
2. Stars of the Summer Night (Henry Wadsworth Longfellow)
3. The Night is Clear and Cloudless (Henry Wadsworth Longfellow)
4. Ring Out Wild Bells (Alfred Lord Tennyson)
5. Break, Break, Break, at the Foot of Thy Stones, O Sea (Alfred Lord Tennyson)
6. From the Close-shut Window (Lowell)
7. Battle of the Baltic (Campbell)
8. I am Weary with Rowing (William Wetmore Story)
- Six Songs (Bret Harte), Oliver Ditson, 1870
1. The Heathen Chinee
2. Chiquita
3. Twenty years
4. Jim
5. Flynn of Virginia
6. Upon the Stanislow
- Our Young Folks: Six Little Songs, G. D. Russell publisher, 1870
1. (Unknown song)
2. The Rivulet (Lucy Larcom)
3. Lady Moon (Lord Houghton/Richard Monckton Milnes)
4. Little Nanny (Lucy Larcom)
5. Swing Away (Lucy Larcom)
6. Berrying Song (Lucy Larcom)
- Three Songs, G. D. Russell publisher, 1870
1. Violet (Colonel John Hay), 1825
2. We Two (Jean Ingelow), 1840
3. The Lighthouse-keeper's Child (Thomas Hood), 1849
- Two Barcaroles (Luigi Catani), Ditson
1. The Honeymoon, 1884
2. A Year After, 1886

other single songs, all published by Oliver Ditson unless noted

- Aftermath (Henry Wadsworth Longfellow), 1873
- Ah! When the Fight is Won (Recitative and Air) (from Lowell's R.G.S. Memoriae Positum), 1892
- A Letter (Frederick Locker-Lampson), 1876
- Anacreontic (as sung by Mrs. Wilson Eyre) (Leigh Hunt), 1876
- The Angelus (Frances L. Mace), 1883
- At the Garden Gate (Frank Dempster Sherman), 1891
- Ave Maria, 1873
- After Absence (Lilla Cabot Perry), 1893
- Aftermath (Henry Wadsworth Longfellow)
- Baby's Shoes (Julia Ward Howe), W. H. Boner & Co., 1870
- Battle of the Baltic (unknown author), 1857
- The Bell Buoy (Rudyard Kipling), 1901
- Bells on the Wind (Mrs. F. M. Ritter), 1880s
- Beyond the Smiling and the Weeping (with optional mixed quartet) (Horatius Bonar), 1876
- The Black Friar (unknown author), 1858
- The Bobolink (G. P. Lathrop), 1877
- Bring Me No Cup (On a Motif from Lethe) (unknown author), 1891
- Bring the Bowl which you Boast (unknown author), 1858
- Broken Rhythm: My Oars Keep Time (H. Trusta/Elizabeth Stuart Phelps), 1850s, reissued 1876
- Castibelza (after Victor Hugo), 1885
- Changed (from Longfellow's Aftermath), 1873
- Coming (words from Marigold Leaves) (unknown author), 1875
- The Confession (Praed), 1873
- The Cumberland (Henry Wadsworth Longfellow), 1863
- The Destruction of the Assyrians (from Hebrew Melodies) (Lord Byron), 1888
- Dormi, Jesu! The Virgin's Cradle-hymn (Samuel Taylor Coleridge), 1859
- Douglas, Tender and True (Miss Mulock), 1884
- Echoes (Christopher Pearse Cranch), 1877
- Egyptian Serenade (George William Curtis), 1887
- The First Cricket (William Dean Howells), 1876
- The Fisherman's Song (Rose Terry Cooke), 1870
- Flow On, Sad Stream (William Wetmore Story), 1876
- Garden of Roses (William Wetmore Story), 1863
- Gipsies Song (unknown author), 1857
- Goodbye (Samuel G. Goodrich), 1858
- Guild the Engineer (Ballad) (unknown author), 1873
- Heigh-Ho! (Christopher Pearse Cranch), William A. Pond & Co. publisher, 1870
- Here's a health to King Charles (William Makepeace Thackeray), 1867
- Home (Last Words in a Strange Land) (James Thomas Fields), 1880
- How to Put the Question (Mrs. Caroline Spencer), S. Brainard's Sons publisher, 1870
- If You Love Me (L. Clark), 1890
- I know not if Moonlight (unknown author), 1883
- In Memory of Oliver Wendell Holmes (Samuel Francis Smith), C.W. Thompson & Co. publisher, 1899
- In the Cathedral (Katherine Saunders), Arthur P. Schmidt publisher, 1881
- In the Summer Even (from "Rohan's Ghost" by Harriet Elizabeth Prescott Spofford), 1876
- Into my Heart a Silent Look (Edward Bulwer-Lytton), 1885
- Jenny Kissed Me (Leigh Hunt)
- King Macbeth (song for baritone) (Edward Robert Bulwer Lytton/Owen Merideth), 1870
- Kyrie Eleison (Henry Wadsworth Longfellow), 1857
- Laus Deo (with chorus ad lib) (John Greenleaf Whittier), 1868
- Leoni John Ruskin, C.W. Thompson & Co. publisher, 1900
- Lethe (with optional 'cello or violin) (M.A. Barr), 1888, reissued 1911
- My Life is like the Summer-Rose (unknown author), 1873
- Love Song (Robert Burns Wilson), 1888
- The Mahogany Tree (unknown author), 1858
- Maria Mater (from Memento Rerum Conditor)
- Master Love (Collin Rae-Brown), 1876
- Memories Come O'er Me (William Wetmore Story), Lee & Walker publisher, 1876
- Metempsychosis (J.B., from the London World), 1890
- New Year's Bells (Alfred Tennyson), 1881
- The Night Has a Thousand Eyes (Francis William Bourdillon), 1874
- The Nightingale (Lust'ge Vögel in dem Wald), 1889
- Non Partir (And wilt thou go) (A. Casini; English version by Christopher Pearse Cranch), 1869
- Nora Macarty (Thomas Bailey Aldrich), 1878
- Notturno (Roman Serenade) (unknown author), White-Smith publisher
- No More (Friedrich Rückert), 1873
- O Domine Deus (O Lord my God) (prayer of Mary, Queen of Scots), Prüfer publisher, 1874
- O Light at my Window (Christopher Pearse Cranch), William A. Pond & Co. publisher, 1870
- O Long and Lagging Hours of Time (Harriet Elizabeth Prescott Spofford), in Harper's Magazine, 1885
- The Old Clock on the Stairs (with optional chorus) (Henry Wadsworth Longfellow, 1886
- O Well for the Fisherman's Boy (or Break, Break) (unknown author), 1857
- Poor lone Hannah: As sung by Miss Adelaide Phillips (Lucy Larcom), 1869
- Regrets (C. S. T.), 1876
- Rose Aylmer (Walter Savage Landor), 1875
- The Rose upon the Balcony (William Makepeace Thackeray), 1866
- The Sailor's Wife (Charles Mackay), 1864
- The Sea Has Its Pearls (Das Meer hat seine Perlen) (after Heinrich Heine), 1862
- Serenade (Frederick Locker-Lampson), 1869
- Sixty and Six (Thomas Wentworth Higginson), 1890
- A Song of Long Ago (G. P. Lathrop), 1887
- The Song of the Sea (William Dean Howells), 1872
- Song of the Stromkerl (unknown author), 1868
- A Spanish Cradle Song (unknown author), 1893
- Spring Song (A Bird Sings Sweet and Strong) (George W. Curtis), 1866
- The Stormy Petrel (Samuel G. Goodrich), 1876
- Strike Me a Note (Thomas William Parsons), 1891
- Sunset in Venice (Barcarole with English and Italian words) (Attilio Sarfatti), J. E. Ditson & Co., 1887
- The Sunset Light (Barcarole) (Mary L. Ritter), Arthur P. Schmidt publishing, 1884
- The Swallows (Gustavo Adolfo Bécquer), 1884
- That Joyous Strain (Christopher Pearse Cranch), 1887
- Thou and I (Words Address to her Sister) (Phoebe Cary), 1875
- Thou dost not Remember the Hour (Ballad) (unknown author), S. Brainard's Sons publisher, 1874
- Three Fishers (unknown author), 1868
- Three Friends of Mine (Sonnet) (Henry Wadsworth Longfellow), 1882
- Through the Long Days" (Col. John Hay), 1878
- A Toast (George Santayana), C.W. Thompson & Co. publisher, 1893
- Twenty Years Ago (William Wetmore Story), 1882
- Vanished Time (William Wetmore Story), 1877
- Waiting for the Bugle (Thomas Wentworth Higginson), 1889
- Waiting for you Jock (Mrs. Moulton's Concert Song) (from Blackwood's Magazine), 1874
- We Shall Meet No More (unknown author), 1886
- We Two are Bound Together (Wir beide sein verbunden), White-Smith publisher
- When Sylvia Sings (Samuel P. Duffield), 1892
- When the Boys Come Home (A Song of '65) (Col. John Hay), 1887
- The Wind Exultant (Winifred Howells), 1888
- Wishing (A Nursery Song), (William Allingham), 1859
- Yon Faithful Star (Serenade) (unknown author), 1873

Vocal duets

- The Brooklet (Henry Wadsworth Longfellow), 1874
- The Clover-blossoms Kiss Her Feet (duet for mezzo-soprano and tenor or baritone) (Oscar Laighton), 1882
- Father the Watches of the Night are O'er (duet for equal voices) (Mrs. Ellen Sturgis Hooper), 1889
- In the Dark, in the Dew (song and duet) (Miss Prescott), 1875
- Love (song or duet for mixed voices) (Mrs. J. T. Fields), 1891
- The Rivulet (duet for mezzo-soprano and tenor or baritone) (Alfred Tennyson), 1882

Large works

- Maria Mater, soloists, chorus and orchestra
- Mass, soloists, chorus and orchestra
- Miserere, a cappella mixed chorus, Oliver Ditson, 1888
- The Song of Zechariah, cantata
- Te Deum (according to the liturgy of the Church of England), soloists, chorus and orchestra, 1884

Shorter choral works and part-songs

- Ave Maria, women's voices and piano or organ, 1897
- The Bells of San Blas (Longfellow), quartet for equal voices, 1882
- Carmen tabernarium (Ad usum sodalium die anniversario XX : iterum impressum die anniversario XLV) (Walter Map), men's voices, published 1929
- Good Lives on Earth (unknown author), canon for three voices, unpublished, c.1890
- Here's a health to King Charles! (Sir Walter Scott), tenor solo and men's chorus, 1867; mixed voices, Ditson, published 1909
- Lead Kindly Light (Rev. Newman), quartet for mixed voices, 1884
- My Harp Has One Unchanging Theme (Deh Senti il Rio), trio for soprano, tenor, and bass, 1893
- A National Anthem (Christopher Pearse Cranch), mixed voices, Ditson, 1881
- Union and Liberty: National Anthem, (Oliver Wendell Holmes), mixed voices and piano, Ditson, 1894
- Vestis Angelica (Thomas Wentworth Higginson), quartet for mixed voices, 1890

Instrumental works

- String quartets

== Bibliography ==
- Recollections of Francis Boott: For His Grandson, F.B.D. (Boston, 1912)
- "Obituary for Francis Boott". The New York Times. New York, New York. March 2, 1904. p. 9.
- Upton, William Treat (1930), Art-Song in America, Boston: Oliver Ditson Company, pp. 51–53
