= Mother of God Cemetery, Covington, Kentucky =

Cemetery in Kenton County, Kentucky, US

Coordinates: 39°02′53″N 84°31′02″W

Mother of God Cemetery
- Interactive map of Mother of God Cemetery

Details
- Location: 2701 Latonia Avenue, Covington, Kentucky

Mother of God Cemetery, Covington, Kentucky, was first located at 26th Street and Madison Avenue in 1849, and was moved to its current location at 2701 Latonia Avenue in 1887. The old cemetery was also known as the Buena Vista Cemetery or St Joseph Cemetery. Some of the graves were moved from the old cemetery, while others were not.

This cemetery was founded as the parish cemetery for Mother of God Parish, Covington's second oldest, which served a German-speaking population. This cemetery evolved from a parish cemetery to a regional one and remains active today.

Frank Duveneck, noted Covington artist, rests in this cemetery; his memorial is by artist Clement Barnhorn, whose Crucifixion Scene is also found in the cemetery.

Pro basketball player Larry Staverman (1936–2007) is buried there.

A listing of graves in this cemetery is available at the Kenton County Public Library in Covington.
