= Sion Longley Wenban =

American landscape painter and graphic artist (1848-1897)

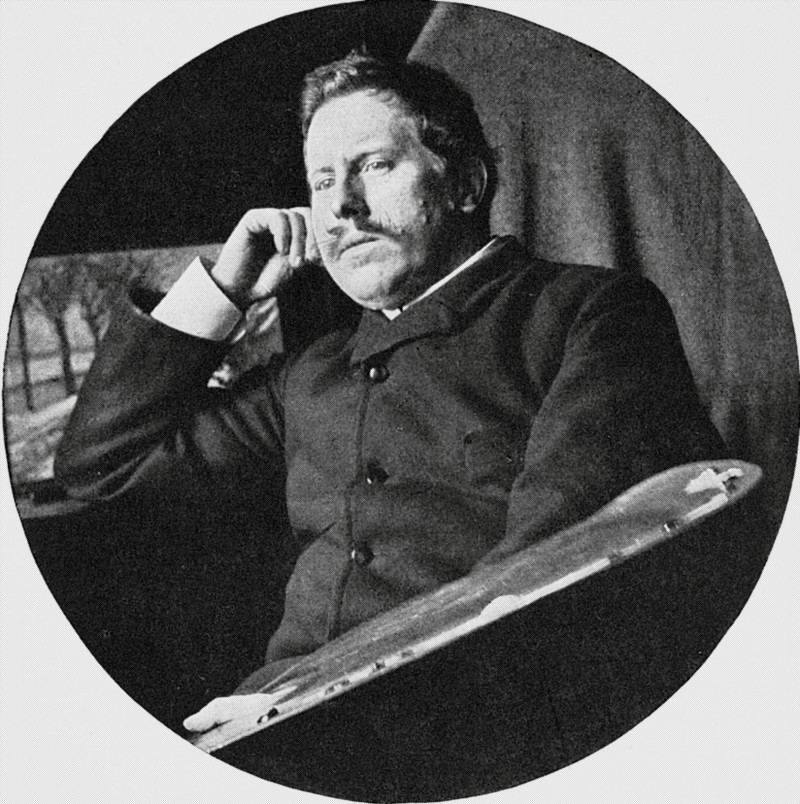
Sion Longley Wenban (date unknown)

Sion Longley Wenban (19 March 1848, Cincinnati - 20 April 1897, Munich) was an American landscape painter and graphic artist who emigrated to Germany.

== Biography ==
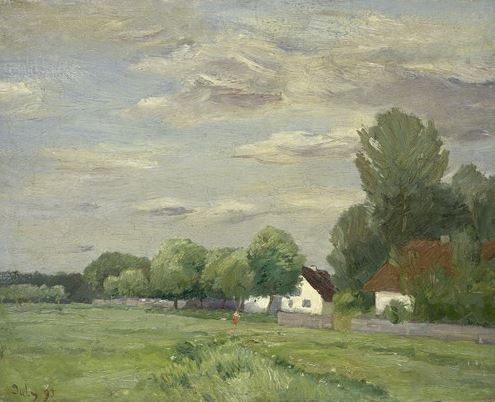
A Village in Summer

His father, John Wenban (1808–1868), was from Hawkhurst, a village in Kent. Sometime during the 1830s, he emigrated to the United States and settled in Cleveland, where he worked as a wagon maker. Sion was the second of three sons. Although born in Cincinnati, he grew up near Cleveland. He originally worked with his father but, at the age of fifteen, became a retoucher in the photography studios of James F. Ryder (1826-1904), where his uncle, the painter Thomas Stevenson, was already employed.

In the late 1860s, he began to take drawing lessons from Lemuel Wilmarth, a Professor at the National Academy of Design, who suggested that Sion continue his studies in Munich, where Wilmarth had studied for several years. In 1869 he moved to Chicago, where he worked for a photographer named E. L. Brand until 1871. Upon returning to Cleveland, he made friends with the painter Otto Henry Bacher, who helped him to learn etching. In 1878, he and Bacher travelled together, visiting London and Paris before reaching Munich. In December, they both enrolled at the Academy of Fine Arts. Wenban's primary instructor was Gabriel von Hackl.

The greatest influence on his style, however, came from the Boston-born landscape painter, Joseph Frank Currier who, in turn, was influenced by the Barbizon School. Another American painter studying there, Frank Duveneck, from Kentucky, also played a significant role.

By 1880, he had established a studio in an unoccupied outbuilding at Schleißheim Palace in Oberschleißheim. That same year, he married Bertha von Langenmantel, the daughter of a royal building inspector. She helped to enhance their meager income by teaching the zither and doing tailoring. They still found it necessary to move frequently. After 1883, he devoted himself more to etching. When the "Munich Association for Original Etchings" was created in 1891, he was given the position of Treasurer. The following year, he was one of the founding members of the Munich Secession.

Due to his long stays in the countryside, regardless of the weather, he was often ill. Shortly after his forty-ninth birthday, he died of dropsy.

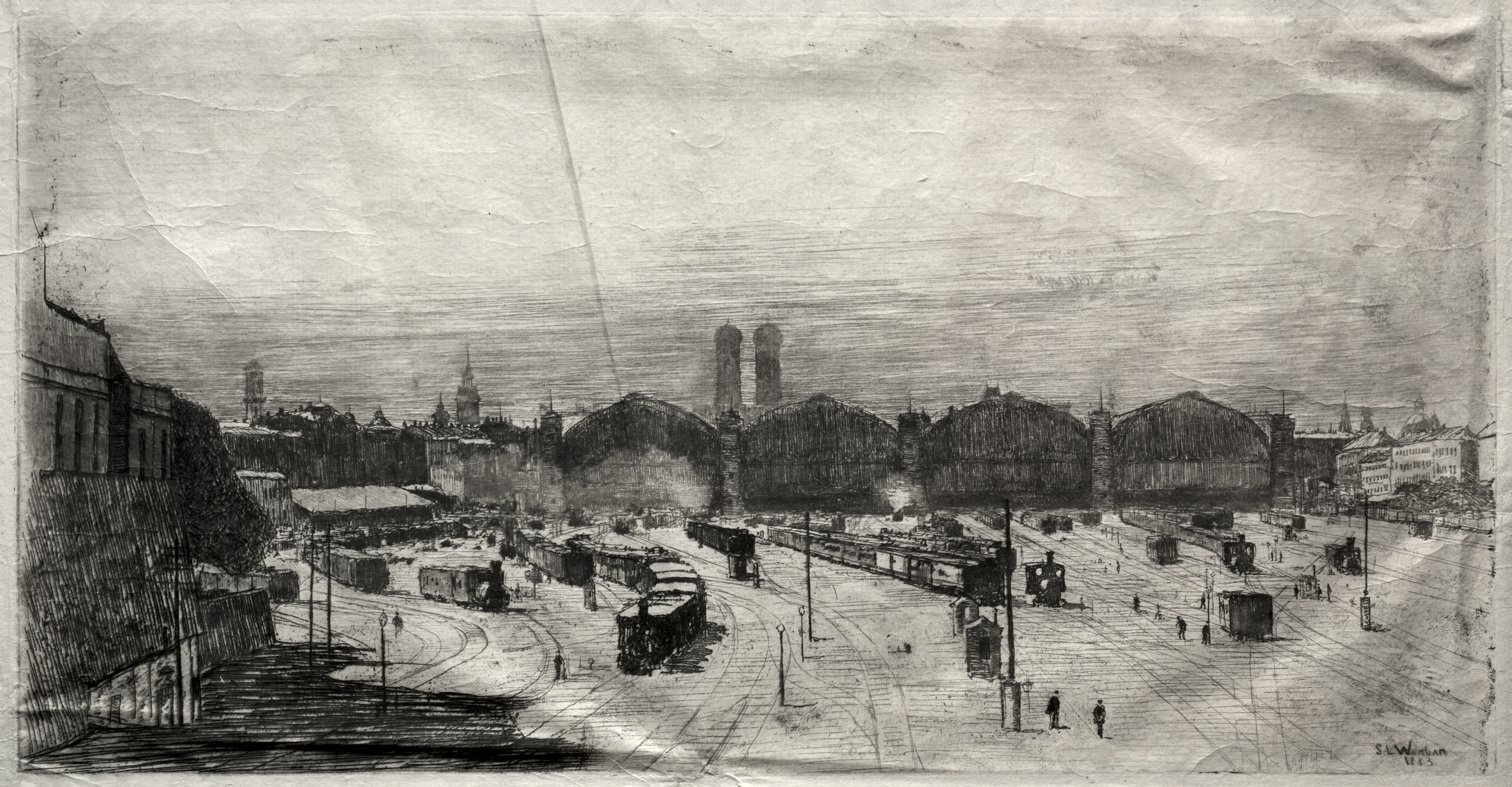
View of the Central Railroad Yards in Munich
