= Cornelia Cassady Davis =

American painter (1870–1920)

- Born: Cornelia Stuart Cassady; December 18, 1870; Cleves, Ohio
- Died: December 23, 1920 (aged 50); Cincinnati, Ohio
- Known for: Painting, Educator
- Spouse: Edward C. Davis (m. 1897)

Cornelia Stuart Cassady Davis (1870–1920) was an American painter known for her portraits of Native Americans of the American west.

== Biography ==
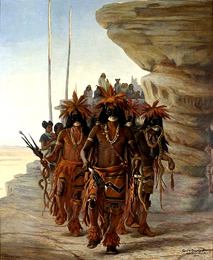
Hopi Snake Dance

Davis née Cassady was born a twin on December 18, 1870, in Cleves, Ohio, to George and Anna Cassady. She studied at the Art Academy of Cincinnati where her teachers included Frank Duveneck. She taught at the Art Academy of Cincinnati from 1891 through 1897. In 1893, she exhibited work at the Woman's Building at the 1893 World's Columbian Exposition in Chicago, Illinois.

In 1897 she married Edward C. Davis and the couple spent their two-year honeymoon in New Mexico and Arizona. Davis painted on the trip, depicting Navajo and Hopi in portraits and sacred ceremonies. She was the first to paint Hopi snake dancers in their ceremonial wear and her paintings are known for their historic and ethnographic qualities. After the Davis' honeymoon, the couple relocated to Chicago, Illinois, where Davis exhibited at the Chicago Art Institute and at Moulton's Gallery with 22 oil paintings primarily featuring the Hopi Indians. In 1898, she exhibited at the Trans-Mississippi Exposition in Omaha, Nebraska. She painted a portrait of President William McKinley which was commissioned for the Westminster Central Hall in London, England.

In 1905 she settled in Cincinnati, Ohio and was a member of the Cincinnati Women's Art Club. In 1913, she was the first women to be admitted to the all-male life class of the Cincinnati Art Club.

Davis died in Cincinnati on December 23, 1920, and is buried at Spring Grove Cemetery.

Her works are in the J.L Hubbell Collection, in Ganado, Arizona, the Butler Institute of American Art in Youngstown, Ohio, and the Santa Fe Collection in Santa Fe, New Mexico.
