= Elizabeth Boott =

American painter

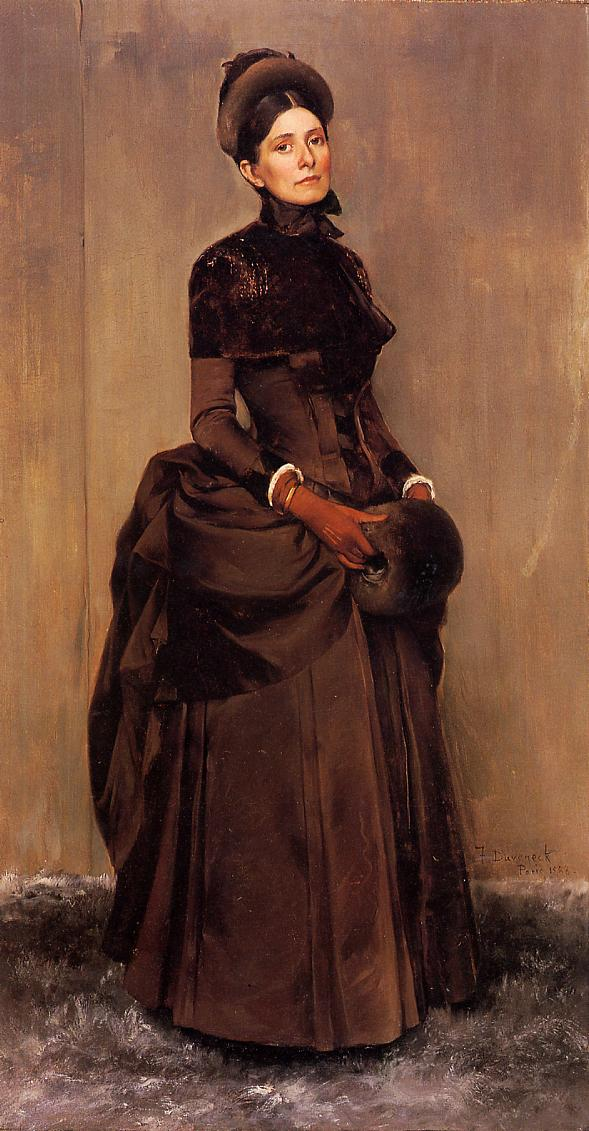
- Born: Elizabeth Otis Lyman Boott; April 13, 1846; Boston, Massachusetts, US
- Died: March 22, 1888 (aged 41); Florence, Italy
- Education: William Morris Hunt; Thomas Couture
- Movement: French Renaissance; Impressionism
- Spouse: Frank Duveneck

Elizabeth Otis Lyman Boott (April 13, 1846 – March 22, 1888) was an American painter of still lifes, landscapes, and portraits. She was the daughter of the classical music composer Francis Boott and Elizabeth (née Lyman) Boott. She married Frank Duveneck, her former teacher, and lived in the Villa Castellini in Florence.

== Early life and education ==
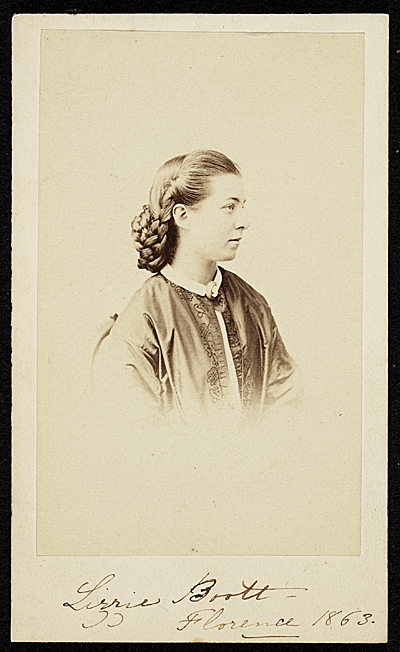
Lizzie Boott Duveneck

Boott was born on April 13, 1846, in Boston, Massachusetts. She was the daughter of the composer Francis Boott and Elizabeth (née Lyman) Boott. Her mother, who died when she was 18 months old, was the eldest daughter of Boston Brahmin George Lyman and his first wife, who was the daughter of Harrison Gray Otis.

Boott was raised by her father in Italy. The pair returned to Boston in 1865.

Boott enrolled at the William Morris Hunt class for women in Boston in 1869, and also studied with Thomas Couture outside Paris for three consecutive summers (1876-1878). She (and her father) also spent the summer of 1879 studying with Frank Duveneck, an artist she and her father admired, in Munich.

Boott's work was shown in multiple exhibitions throughout the United States in the early 1880s. Her first solo show was held in Boston at J. Eastman Chase's Gallery in 1882.

On March 25, 1886, in Paris, Boott married Duveneck. The two had been engaged off and on since 1881. Following their wedding, they lived at the Villa Castellani with her father. Their son, Frank Boott Duveneck, was born on December 18, 1886. He became an engineer and married Josephine Whitney, the daughter of Henry M. Whitney.

She lived later in Paris with her husband and son. She died there on March 22, 1888, of pneumonia. Her memorial in Allori Cemetery in Florence was created by her husband's friend from Cincinnati, Clement Barnhorn in 1891

== Villa Castellini in Florence ==
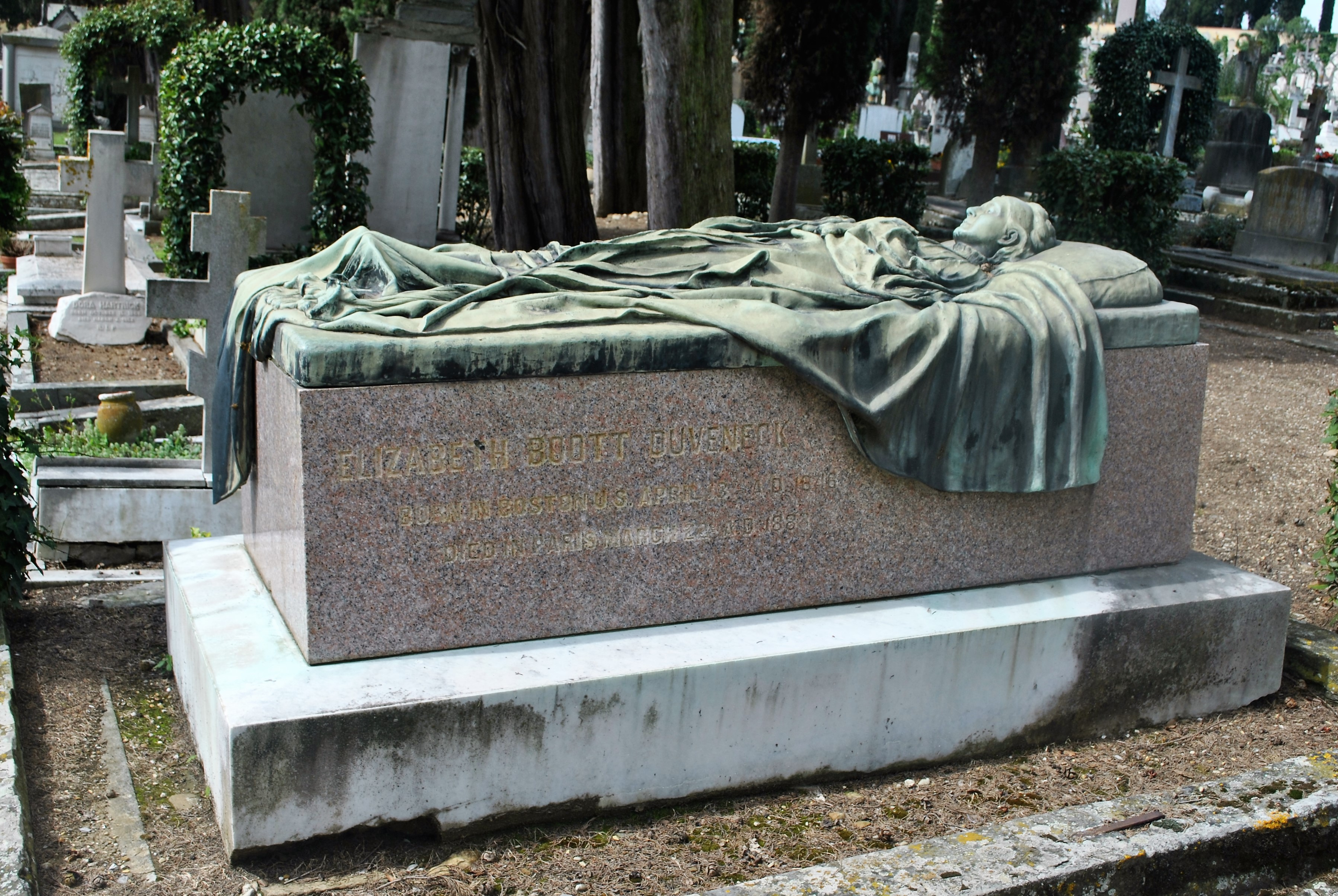
Cimitero degli Allori, Elizabeth Boott

Boott encouraged her teacher Frank Duveneck to move to Florence, with the idea of having him teach a class of women artists - instruction of a sort that was just then coming into vogue.

In the fall of 1879, after nearly a decade in Munich, Duveneck moved to Florence and more than a dozen of his painter friends came with him. They settled at the Villa Castellani, now the Villa Mercede, at Bellosguardo, designed in the 15th century by a follower of Michelangelo and owned in the 19th by a Boston family, who rented out to friends the spacious apartments that surrounded the villa's arcaded center court. It became a magnet for a lively group of male and female art students, and also attracted the attention of author Henry James, who wrote about her and her father's time at Villa Castellini in his novels, Portrait of a Lady and The Golden Bowl.

== Exhibitions ==
- 1883: American Water Color Society
- 1883: Boston Art Club
- 1883: National Academy of Design
- 1883: Boston Museum of Fine Arts
- 1883: Philadelphia Society of Artists
- 1884: Doll & Richards Gallery – Boston
- 1886: Paris Salon

== Gallery ==
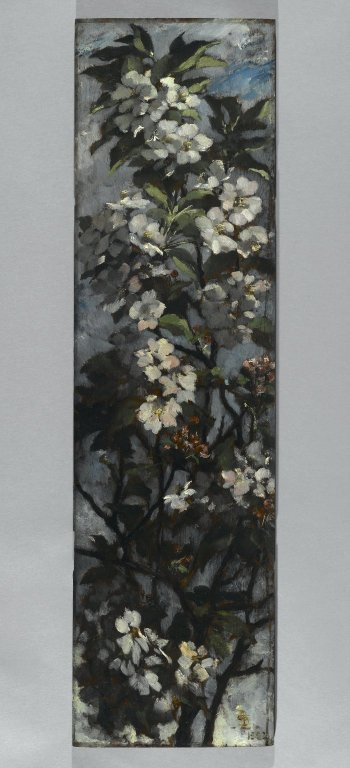
Apple Blossoms, Brooklyn Museum

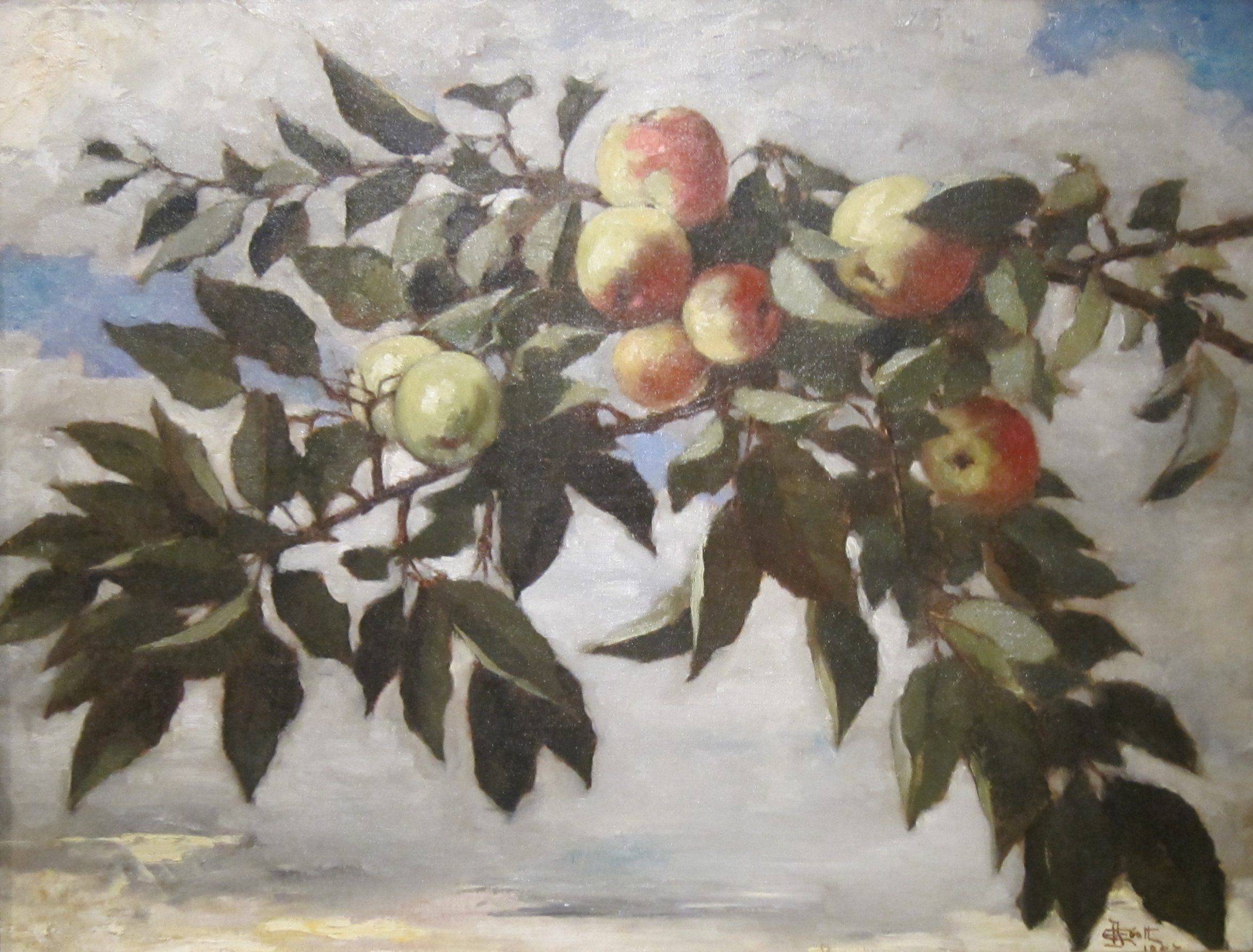
Apple Tree Branches, Cincinnati Art Museum

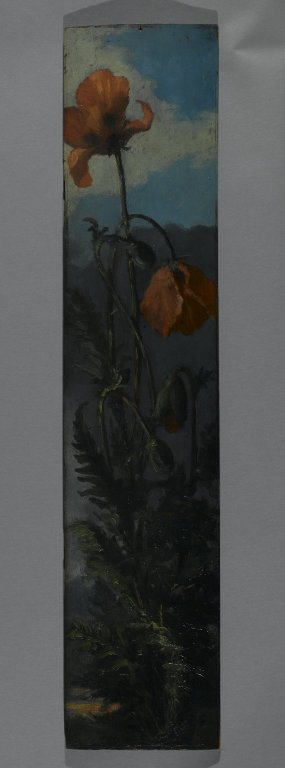
Poppies, Brooklyn Museum
