= Otto Henry Bacher =

American artist

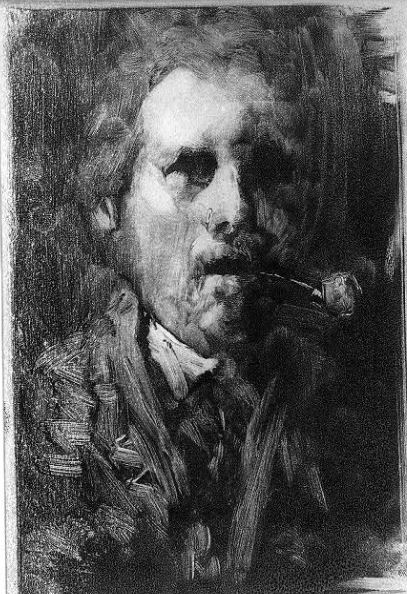
Self-portrait (late 1880s)

Otto Henry Bacher (May 31, 1856, Cleveland - August 16, 1909, Bronxville, New York) was an American artist; primarily known for his etchings and illustrations. He also painted oils in a variety of genres.

== Biography ==
=== Early life ===
He was born to a family of German descent. After attending the public schools, he went to work as a decorative painter in mansions and on ships. In 1874, he was able to begin formal art studies with De Scott Evans, who specialized in still-lifes. Shortly after, he became one of the first members of the "Art Club", founded by Archibald Willard. He also spent a brief period at the Pennsylvania Academy of Fine Arts.

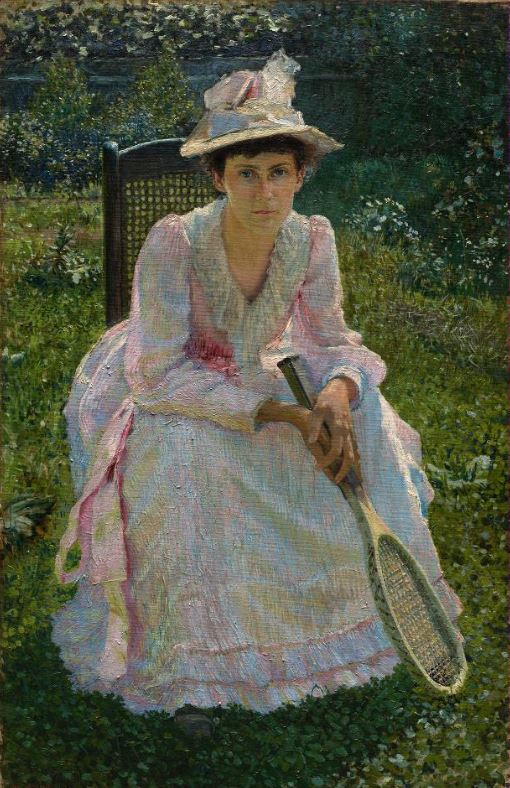
Portrait of his wife, Mary

Upon returning he met a painter newly arrived in Ohio from Massachusetts, Willis Seaver Adams, and they became associates. When Adams helped create the Cleveland Academy of Fine Arts, he had Bacher appointed to the governing board. About this time, he also began to study etching with Sion Longley Wenban, an artist from Cincinnati.

=== Years abroad (much of 1878-88) ===
In 1878, he accompanied Adams to Europe for studies at the Academy of Fine Arts, Munich and, later, with an introduction from Wenban, he studied with Cincinnati-born artist Frank Duveneck, whom he would accompany to Florence and Venice, where they established a studio. Once they were settled, he brought his etching equipment there and became Duveneck's teacher. They produced some of the earliest examples of modern monotypes.

While there, he became friends with James McNeill Whistler and they shared etching techniques. They would continue to visit each other until Whistler's death. In 1908 he published the memoir, Whistler in Venice, originally a serial in The Century Magazine. Bacher was most highly regarded for his etchings, many of them depicting scenes from his early years in Cleveland. He exhibited throughout Western Europe and, in 1881, he was elected a member of the Royal Society of Painter-Etchers.

He returned home in 1883 and opened a studio. Shortly after, he joined with Joseph DeCamp to operate a summer sketching class in Richfield, Ohio. He also began to paint more oils, but was unsuccessful in selling them or other items from his earlier period. As a result, he once again left for Europe; this time, Paris, where he took some classes at the Académie Julian. He was there for only a short time before continuing on to Venice, where he shared an apartment and studio with Robert Frederick Blum and Charles Ulrich.

=== Back in the USA (1888-1909) ===
By 1888, Bacher was back in the United States and had settled in New York City after marrying a former art student from Cleveland, Mary Holland. They had four sons.

He was a much sought-after illustrator, both for books and magazines, such as Scribner's and McClure's. In 1901, he became one of the founding members of the Society of Illustrators. He won a silver medal for his etchings at the St. Louis Exposition of 1904 and was elected an associate of the National Academy of Design in 1906.

He spent the last years of his life in Bronxville and died there in 1909, from an undisclosed illness.

== Selected works ==
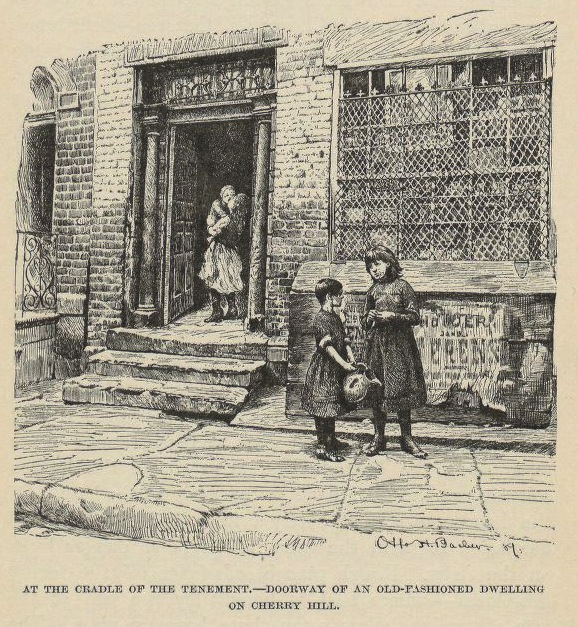
Illustration for How the Other Half Lives by Jacob Riis

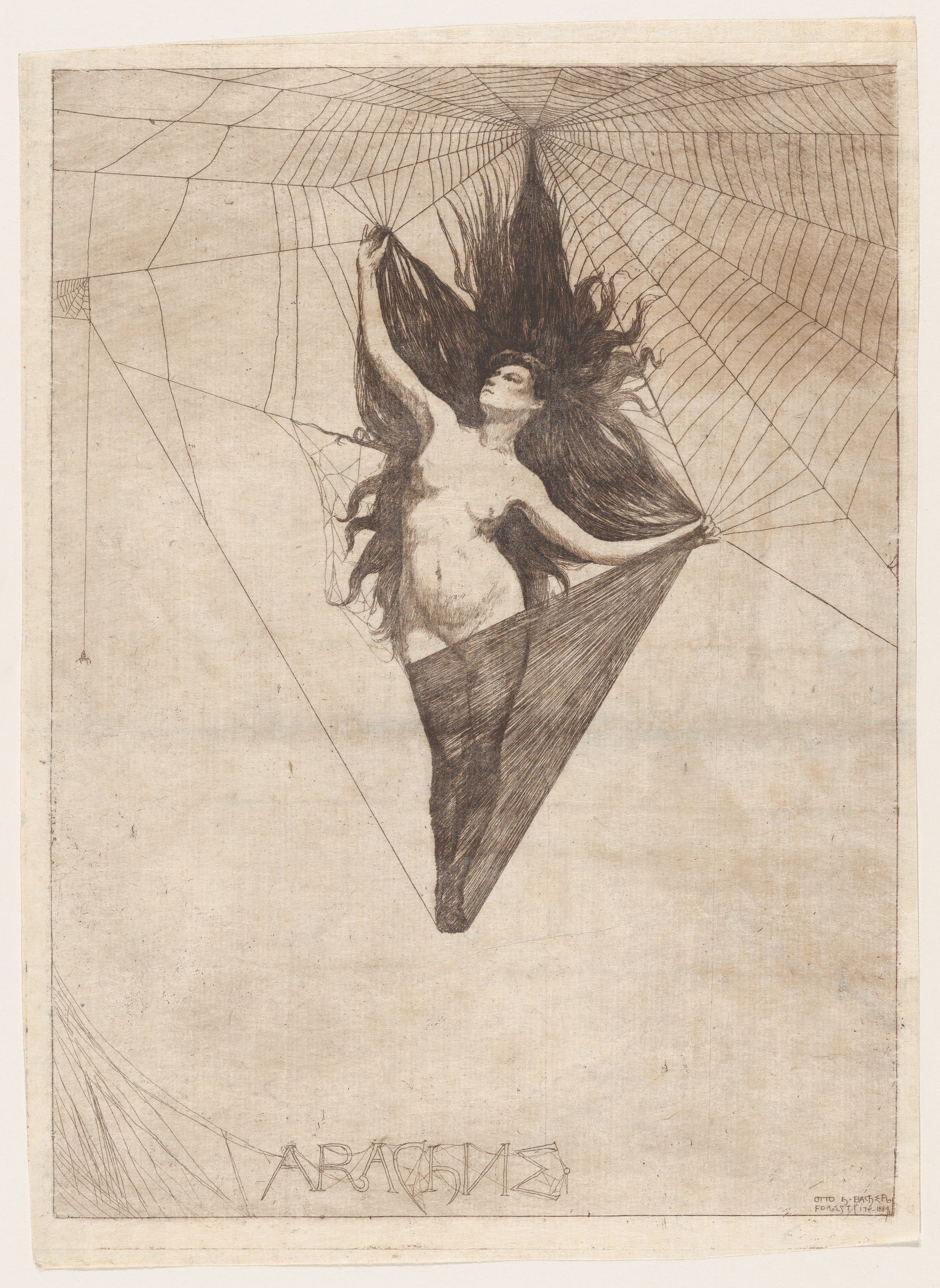
Arachne

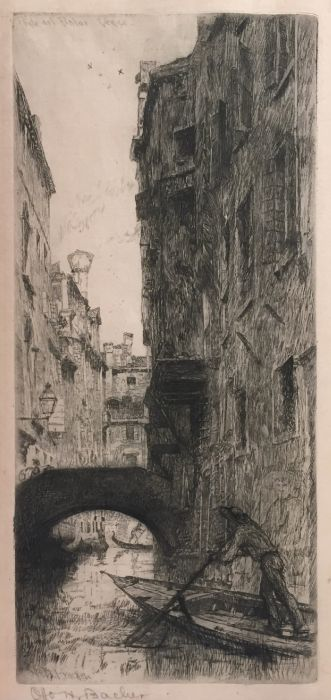
Ponte del Pistor, Venice

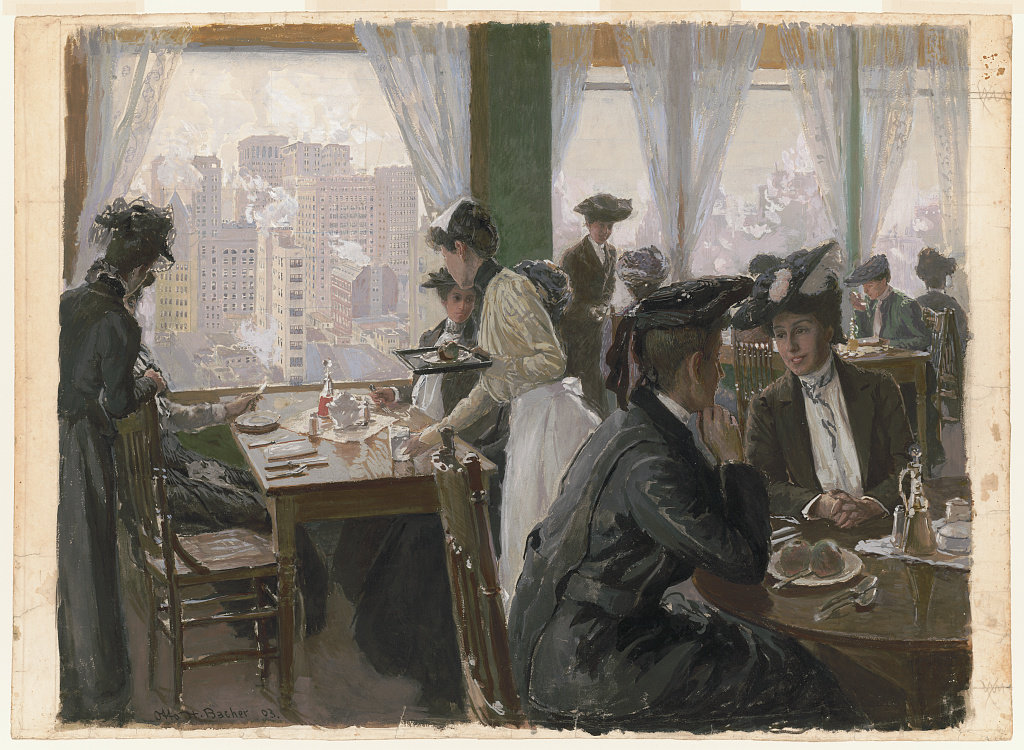
Women in a Restaurant
