= Hidden Villa =

Non-profit organisation in the USA

Coordinates: 37.351361°N 122.160987°W

- Type: Non-governmental organization
- Location: 26870 Moody Rd, Los Altos Hills, CA 94022

Hidden Villa is a United States nonprofit educational organization teaching programs on environmental and multicultural awareness. In 1924, Frank and Josephine Duveneck founded this working organic farm and wilderness area on land comprising the upper Adobe Creek watershed on the foothills of Black Mountain in Los Altos Hills, California, part of the Santa Cruz Mountains. Hidden Villa is important historically as the site of the West's first American youth hostel and the nation's first multicultural children's summer camp.

== History ==
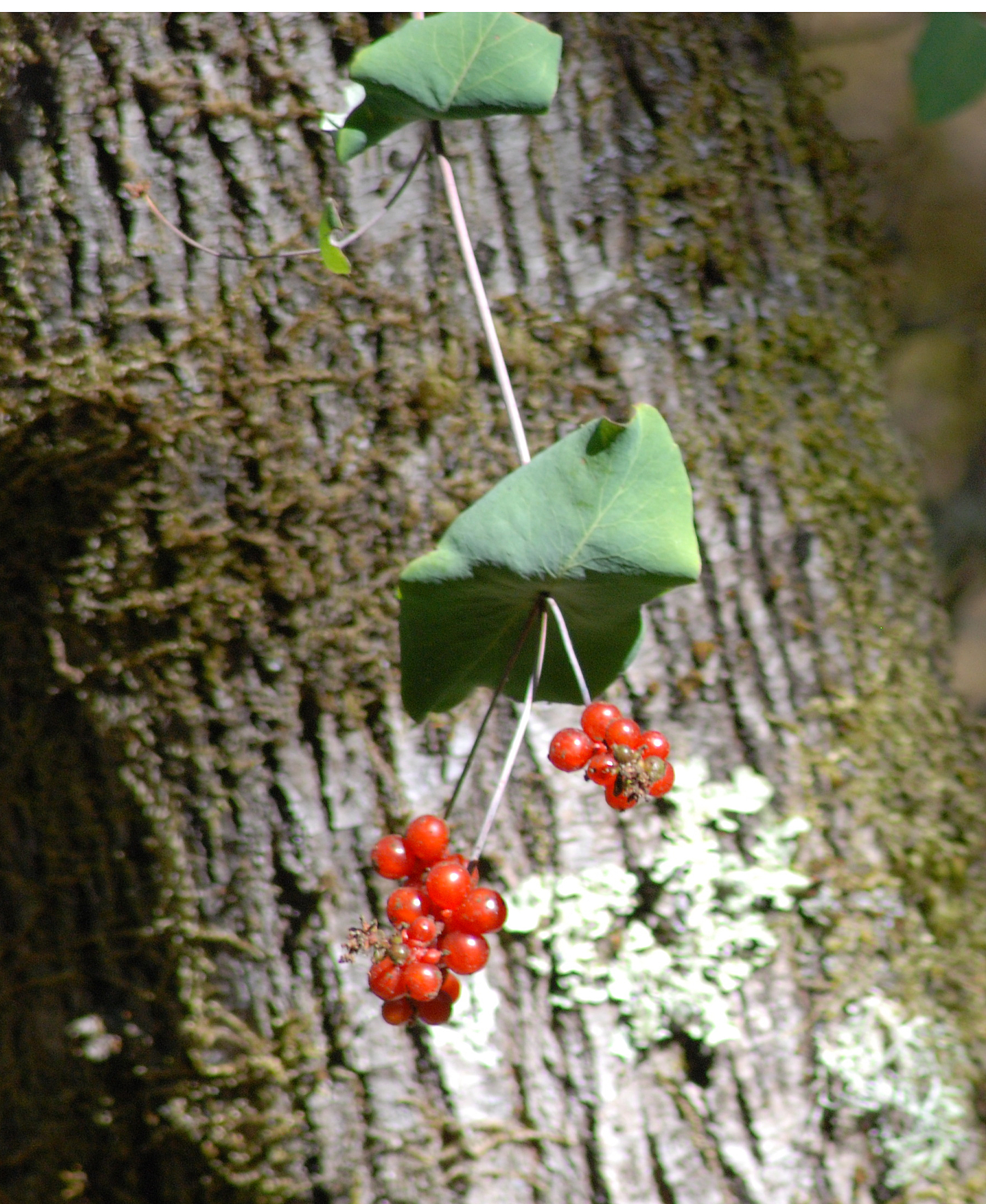
Hidden Villa shelters many California native plants such as this native honeysuckle Lonicera hispidula 2010

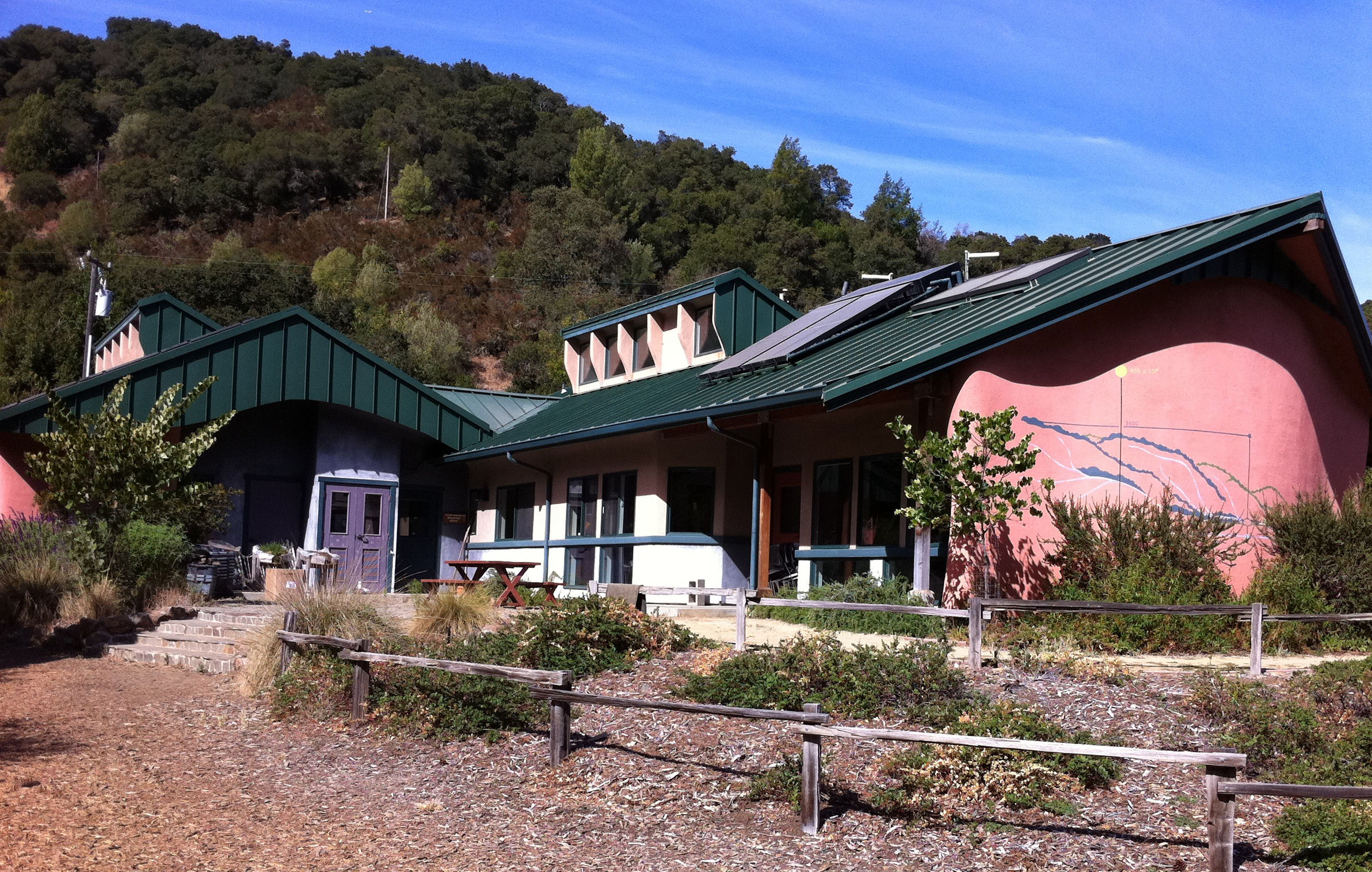
Novel construction of the Hidden Villa Education Center includes a 5.4 kW photovoltaic system, passive solar heating and cooling, trombe wall, thermal mass, and straw bale construction.

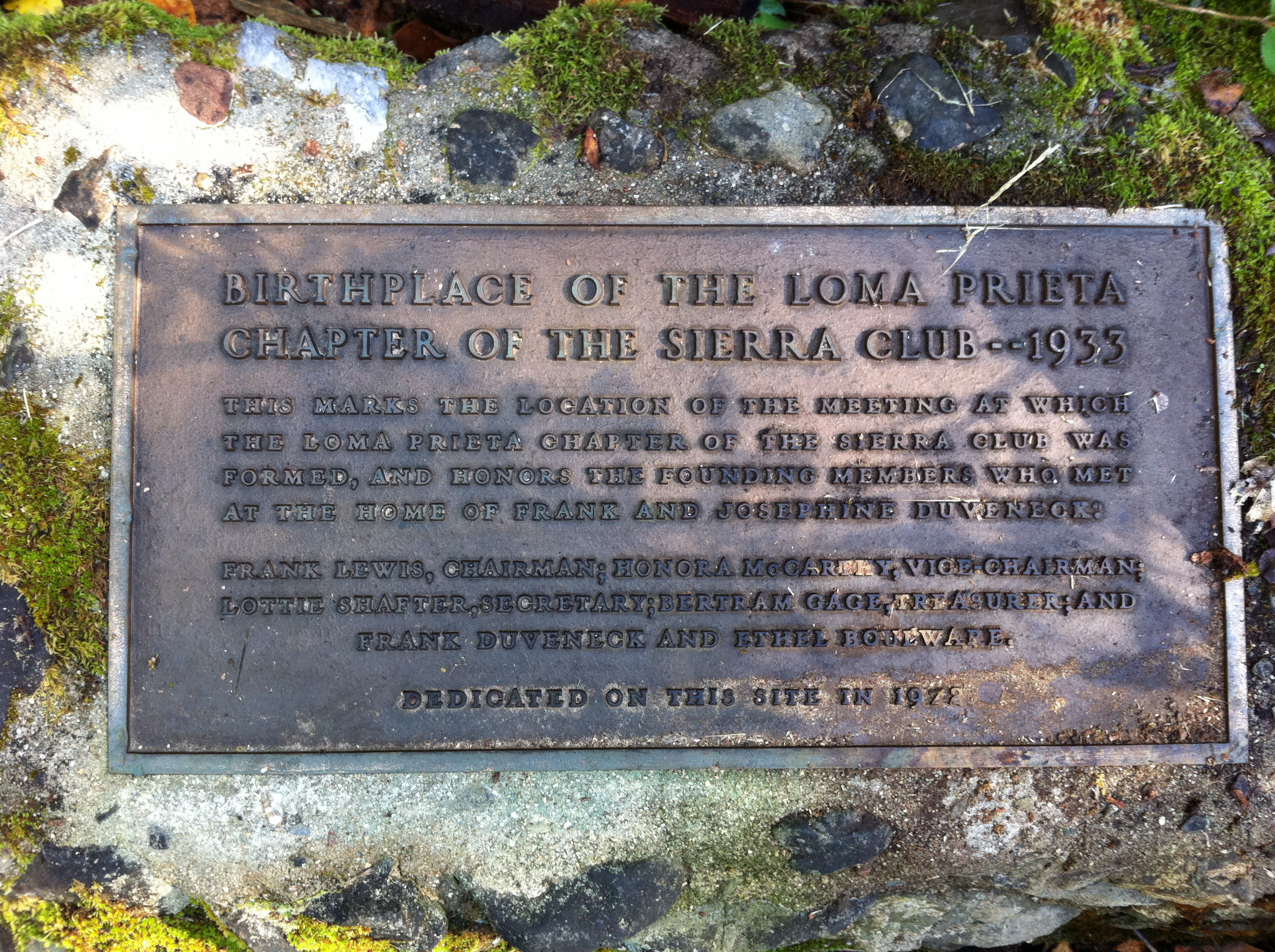
Plaque commemorating 1933 founding of the Loma Prieta Chapter of the Sierra Club lies on Adobe Creek Trail above Hidden Villa Ranch.

The land between Moody Road and Adobe Creek was part of the Rancho La Purísima Concepción land grant given in 1840 to José Gorgonio and his son José Ramon, Ohlone Indians of Mission Santa Clara, by Governor Juan Alvarado.

George Washington Moody built Moody Road in 1867, from the Mountain View Railway station through what is now Hidden Villa Ranch to connect to Mayfield-Pescadero Road (now Page Mill Road). Moody was a farmer and native of Missouri whose home ultimately became Hidden Villa Ranch. Moody's home was located on present-day Moody Creek.

In 1887, the 600-plus acres of Hidden Villa were purchased by Otto Arnold, a native of Saxony. Mr. Arnold accompanied Governor Milton Latham to America, and became a resident of San Francisco in 1864 where he, along with Latham, was connected with the London and San Francisco Bank Ltd (now MUFG Union Bank). After the death of his widow, Elvira Arnold, in 1904, Hidden Villa was owned by Captain George Ewing, for whom Ewing Hill (the source of the West Branch of Permanente Creek) is named. Frank Boott Duveneck, son of the painters Frank Duveneck and Elizabeth Boott, and his wife Josephine, daughter of Henry Melville Whitney, bought the then 1,400 acres of Hidden Villa in 1923 for "$10 in gold coin and the payment of a $20,000 mortgage". The Duvenecks remodeled the White House at Hidden Villa, which dates from the 1860s, when it was built as a stagecoach stop and inn for a stage running from San Jose to Pescadero. The White House was also known as the Halfway House because it was halfway between the two cities (eight miles from each one). In 1930 the Duvenecks built their permanent home on the knoll.

Frank Duveneck founded the Loma Prieta Chapter of the Sierra Club with 53 charter members in 1933. It was the 4th chapter founded in the club and its founding is marked by a placard at the top of the Creek Trail. Frank and Josephine were also founders of Friends Outside, a support group for prisoners and their families. The Duvenecks sheltered Japanese-Americans returning from internment camps and provided safe harbor for César Chávez as he organized farm workers in the fifties.

In 1937, Frank and Josephine Duveneck opened the West's first American youth hostel at Hidden Villa. The nation's first multicultural children's summer camp has operated there since 1945. Hidden Villa was incorporated as The Trust for Hidden Villa, 501(c)(3) nonprofit corporation, in 1960. Hidden Villa's Environmental Education Program was launched in 1970.

Hidden Villa was donated, by the whole Duveneck family, to the people of the region upon Frank's death in 1985. It was a major concern of the Duvenecks that the headwaters of Adobe Creek would be protected so that the water would never be polluted. They purchased land to protect the entire upper watershed, growing Hidden Villa to 1600 acres, creating one of the few virginal watersheds in the Bay Area. By 1982, the Midpeninsula Regional Open Space District had purchased conservation easements on 1,560 of the 1,600 acres, leaving only the lower 40 acres for possible development. This fulfilled the wishes of the Duvenecks, as Josephine Duveneck records in her book Life on Two Levels, "Our family came to the agreement that a large part of the wilderness area, including the creek and its pristine watershed, should be dedicated at our death to public use as a permanent wild life sanctuary."

== Educational programs ==
Hidden Villa's educational programs include environmental education, day and residential summer camps, community programs on sustainability, animal husbandry and nature, and its community supported agriculture program which supplies local, organic, and sustainably grown produce to neighboring communities and service organizations. Attendance is 30,000 persons per year for these educational programs. Outside of the formal educational programs, children, adults, and families can visit with farm animals, explore the farm's gardens or hike on the surrounding eight miles (13 km) of trails.

== Hiking ==
Hidden Villa is almost surrounded by open space including Monte Bello Open Space Preserve and Rancho San Antonio Open Space Preserve. The farm complex and hostel are located in a valley at about 500 feet (150 m) above sea level, and the hiking trail along the east fork of Adobe Creek, the "Creek Trail", is an easy two mile hike along the wooded canyon just above Hidden Villa where the creek still flows year-round. Two routes connect Hidden Villa to the Black Mountain Trail at Ewing Hill at 1,200 feet (370 m) of elevation, the Hostel Trail (1.3 miles) or the Creek Trail (1 mile) connecting to the Ewing Trail (0.3 miles). The Black Mountain Trail then continues up a strenuous 3 miles (4.8 km) to the 2,800-foot (850 m) summit of Black Mountain.

== Ecology ==
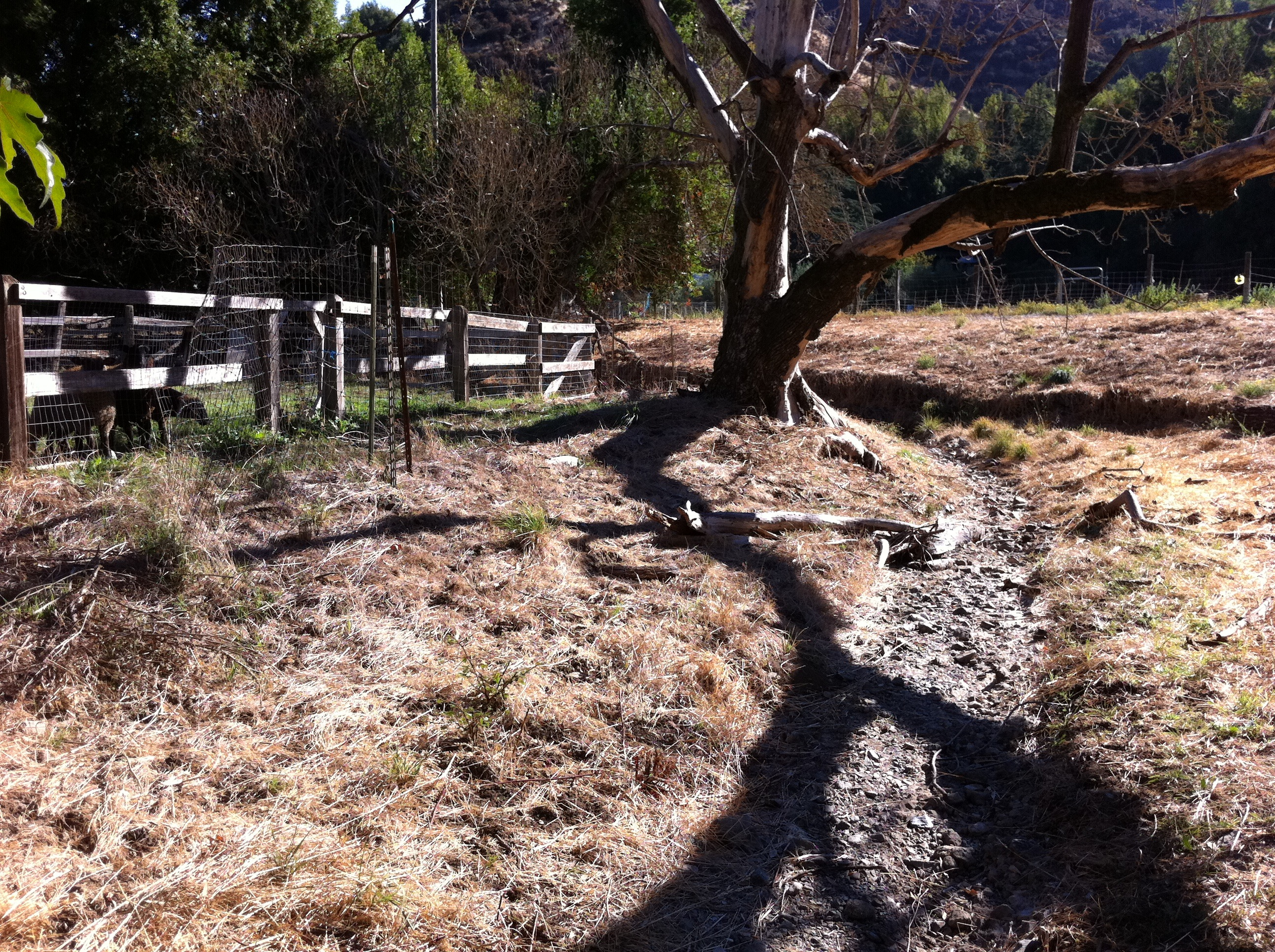
Loss of streamside (riparian) vegetation increases stream velocity, causing downstream erosion and channel incision (dark gully behind tree)

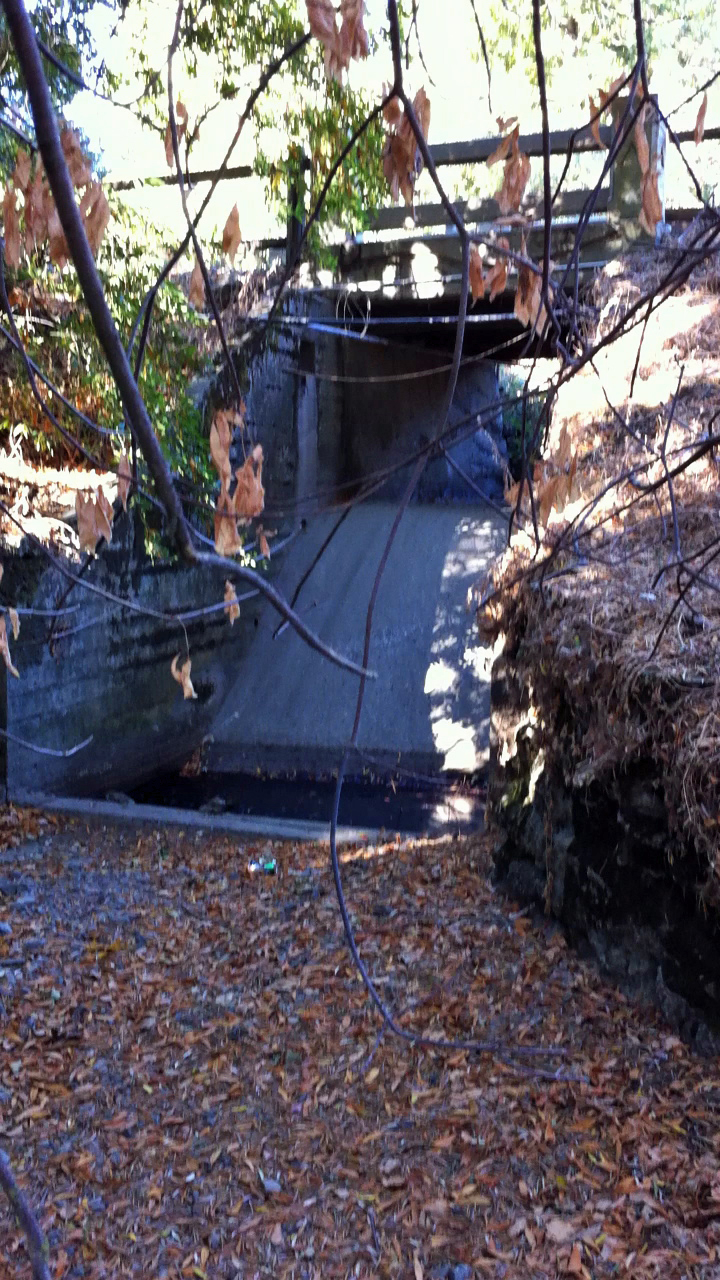
This drop under the Hidden Villa bridge is one of several barriers to steelhead trout spawning runs on Adobe Creek

Steelhead trout (Oncorhynchus mykiss) occurred historically in Adobe Creek with reports of the fish being in Adobe Creek in the Sportsman Gazetteer for 1877 and again in 1898 in a report to the U.S. Bureau of Fisheries based on collections likely made in 1898. The reaches upstream from Hidden Villa have been judged excellent trout habitat. Local historian Florence Fava also reported that "the creeks which lace the property and join Adobe Creek were originally full of fish".

Adobe Creek was once a perennial stream, as steelhead trout young spend their first year in fresh water and obviously cannot survive in streams that run dry seasonally. Historically lawsuits were filed to prevent diversion of creek water for irrigation because they caused the creek to run "dry certain seasons of the year". This written record confirms oral histories taken by local historian Don McDonald that Adobe Creek used to flow year-round. A 1909 land office brochure promoted Los Altos for its "never-failing mountain trout stream, trout caught a few feet from kitchen doors".

The California Native Plant Society's Santa Clara Valley Chapter maintains a native plant nursery at Hidden Villa, and holds two plant sales annually in April and October. The Santa Clara Valley Chapter serves Santa Clara County and southern San Mateo County.

== Development controversy ==
In March, 2008, Hidden Villa leased ten acres of its land to the nonprofit charitable organization, Heifer International, providing the former with $100,000 per year in rental income. However, Heifer International's plans to develop a 7,100-square-foot (660 m^{2}) development comprising a support center and several structures that would depict Third World country villages within 50 feet (15 m) of Adobe Creek, has met with opposition from Los Altos Hills residents. Hidden Villa zoning is managed by Santa Clara County which requires a 150-foot (46 m) setback from the creek's bank. One concern of residents is risk of flooding from development on the creek's floodplain on Hidden Villa property, as the creek has a history of flooding, with flood damages occurring in 1952, 1955, 1983, 1986, 1995 and 1998. A letter to the Santa Clara County Board of Supervisors from FEMA designated a strip through the lower fields as having a 1 in 500 year chance of flooding. Heifer estimated that approximately 10,800 visitors annually would visit the 8.5-acre site, which would work out to about 45 students on any given day. The project has since been cancelled.
