= Frank Duveneck =

American figure and portrait painter (1848–1919)

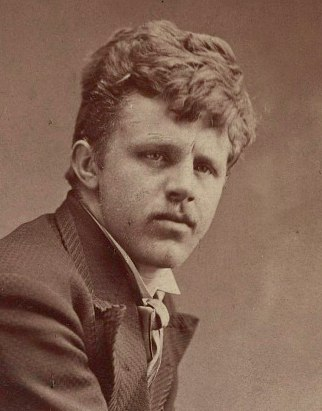
- Photograph of Duveneck, 1877
- Born: Frank Decker; October 9, 1848; Covington, Kentucky, U.S.
- Died: January 3, 1919 (aged 70); Cincinnati, Ohio, U.S.
- Education: Royal Academy of Munich
- Known for: Painter; teacher
- Movement: Orientalist, Realist
- Spouse: Elizabeth Boott (m. 1886; died 1888)

Frank Duveneck (né Decker; October 9, 1848 – January 3, 1919) was an American figure and portrait painter.

== Early life ==
Duveneck was born in Covington, Kentucky, the son of German immigrant Bernhard Decker. Decker died in a cholera epidemic when Frank was only a year old, and his widow remarried Joseph "Squire" Duveneck. By the age of 15, Frank had begun the study of art under the tutelage of a local painter, Johann Schmitt, and had been apprenticed to a German firm of church decorators.

While having grown up in Covington, Duveneck was a part of the German community in Cincinnati, Ohio, just across the Ohio River. Due to his Catholic beliefs and German heritage, though, he was an outsider as far as the artistic community of Cincinnati was concerned.

== Career ==
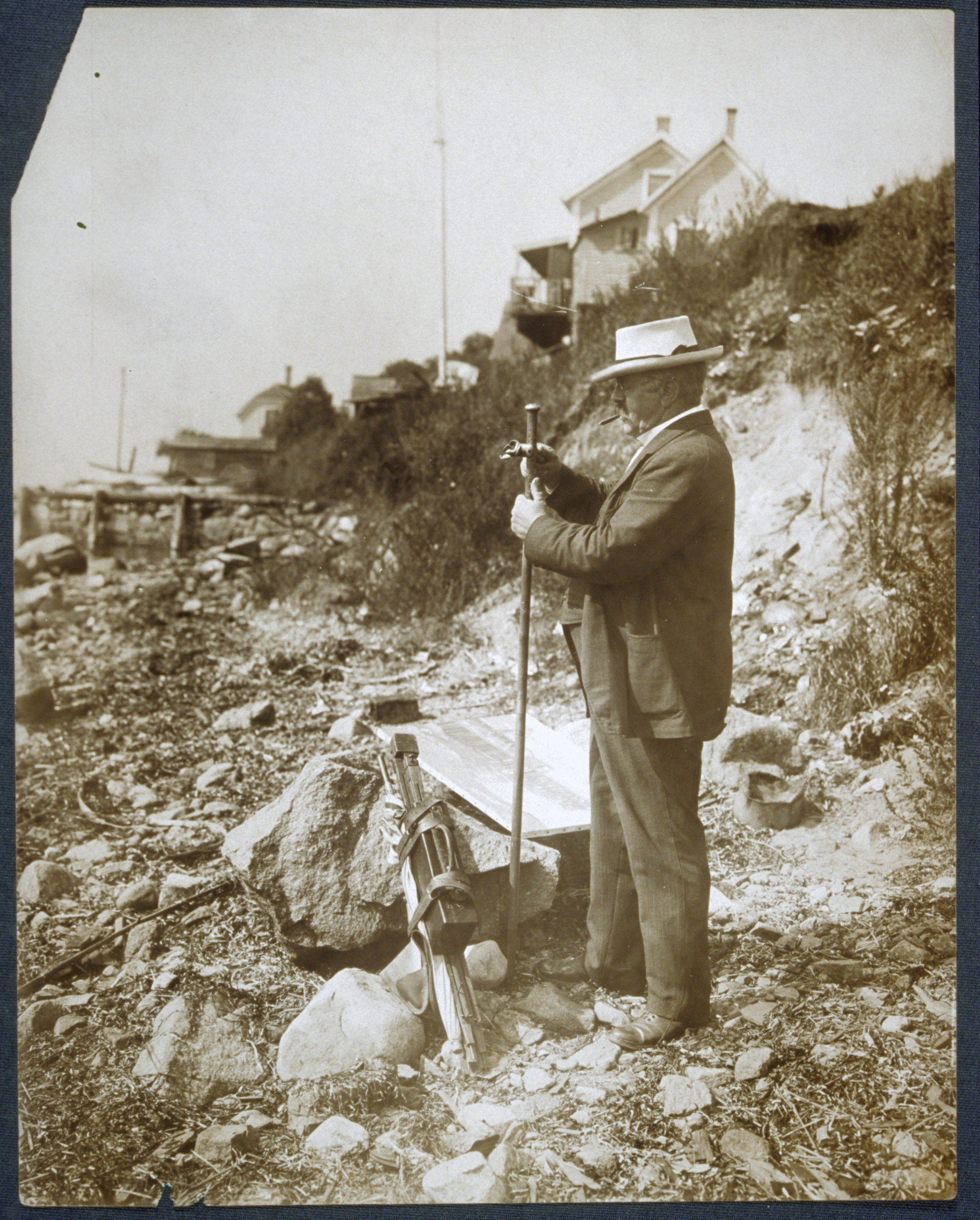
Duveneck c. 1910

In 1869, he went abroad to study with Wilhelm von Diez and Wilhelm Leibl at the Royal Academy of Munich, where he learned a dark, realistic, and direct style of painting. He subsequently became one of the young American painters—others were William Merritt Chase, John Henry Twachtman, Willis Seaver Adams, Ross Sterling Turner, and Walter Shirlaw—who in the 1870s overturned the traditions of the Hudson River School and started a new art movement characterized by a greater freedom of paint application.

=== Success ===
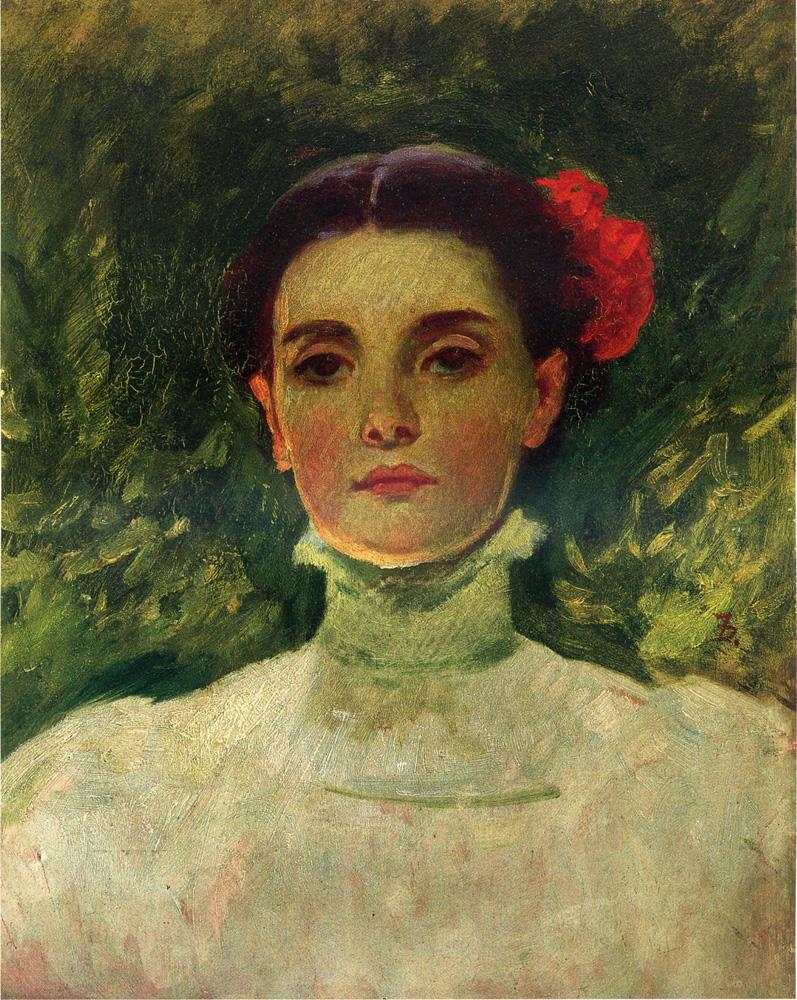
Portrait of Maggie Wilson (1898), oil on board, 38.10 x 30.48 cm, Museum of Fine Arts, Houston, Texas

His work, at first ignored in Covington, attracted great attention when shown at the Boston Art Club in 1875, and pupils flocked to him in Germany and Italy, where he made long visits. Henry James called him "the unsuspected genius", and at the age of 27, he was a celebrated artist. In 1878, Duveneck opened a school in Munich, and in the village of Polling in Bavaria. His students, known as the "Duveneck Boys", included John Twachtman, Otto Henry Bacher, Julius Rolshoven, and John White Alexander.

Following the death of his wife in March 1888, he returned to America from Italy and gave some attention to sculpture, and modelled a fine monument to his wife, now in the Cimitero Evangelico agli Allori in Florence. Despite this activity, Elizabeth's death marked a slowing in his productivity; a wealthy man, he chose to lead a life of relative obscurity. He lived in Covington until his death in 1919 and taught at the Art Academy of Cincinnati, where some of his pupils of note were Cornelia Cassady Davis, Ida Holterhoff Holloway, John Christen Johansen, M. Jean McLane, Edward Charles Volkert, Russel Wright, Charles Mills, Frances Farrand Dodge, and Herman and Bessie Wessel.

Among his most famous paintings are Lady with Fan (1873) and The Whistling Boy (1872), both of which reveal Duveneck's debt to the dark palette and slashing brushwork of Frans Hals. His work can be seen at the Metropolitan Museum of Art in New York City, the National Gallery of Art in Washington, DC, the Museum of Fine Arts in Boston, the Cincinnati Art Museum, the Richmond Art Museum, the Hyde Collection in Glen's Falls, New York, the Kenton County Library in Covington, Kentucky, and the Cathedral Basilica of the Assumption, also in Covington and the Frances Lehman Loeb Art Center in Poughkeepsie, New York. A portrait, Young Man with Tousled Hair (The Street Urchin), now in the Smithsonian American Art Museum, was previously in the collection of Kurt Vonnegut. In 1905, he was elected into the National Academy of Design as an associate member, and became a full academician in 1906. He was awarded a special gold medal at the San Francisco Exposition in 1915, and the same year, he presented a large collection of his own works to the Cincinnati museum.

== Personal life ==
On March 25, 1886, Duveneck married one of his students, who was much admired by Henry James, Boston-born Elizabeth Boott. The two had been engaged off and on since 1881. They lived in Villa Castellani in Florence (where she had been raised) for two years. Together, they were the parents of a son, Frank Boott Duveneck. She died in Paris of pneumonia, and Duveneck reportedly was devastated. Later, Duveneck often spent summers in Gloucester, Massachusetts, visiting his son and painting en plein air.

After his death in Cincinnati, Ohio, on January 3, 1919, Duveneck was buried at the Mother of God Cemetery, in Covington. A life-sized bronze statue depicting Duveneck holding a plaque with his wife's picture on it stands in a small park at the intersection of Pike and Washington Streets in Covington.

== Gallery ==
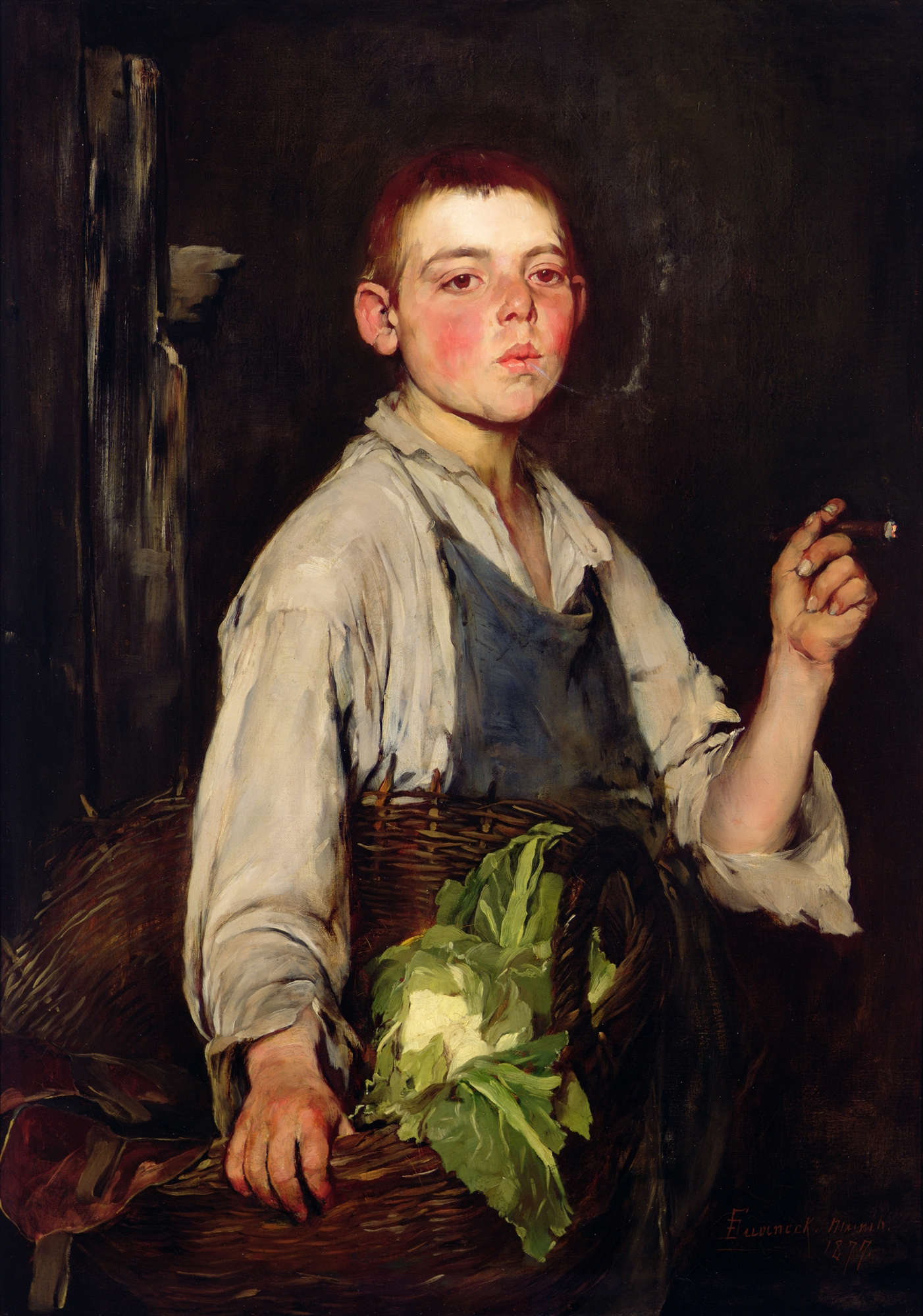
The Cobbler's Apprentice (1877), oil on canvas,
Taft Museum of Art,
Cincinnati, Ohio

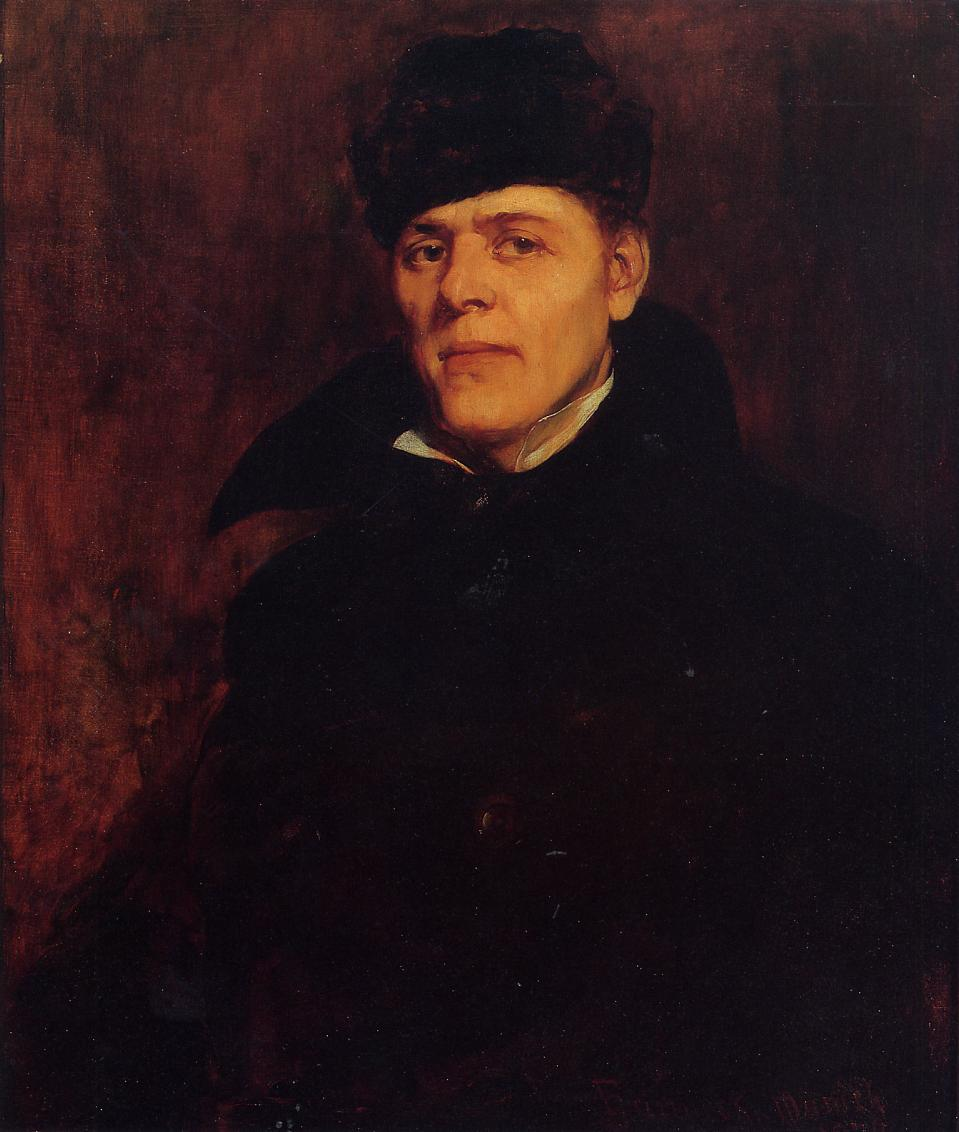
Major Dillard H. Clark (1877),
oil on canvas, formerly
Corcoran Gallery of Art, Washington, D.C.

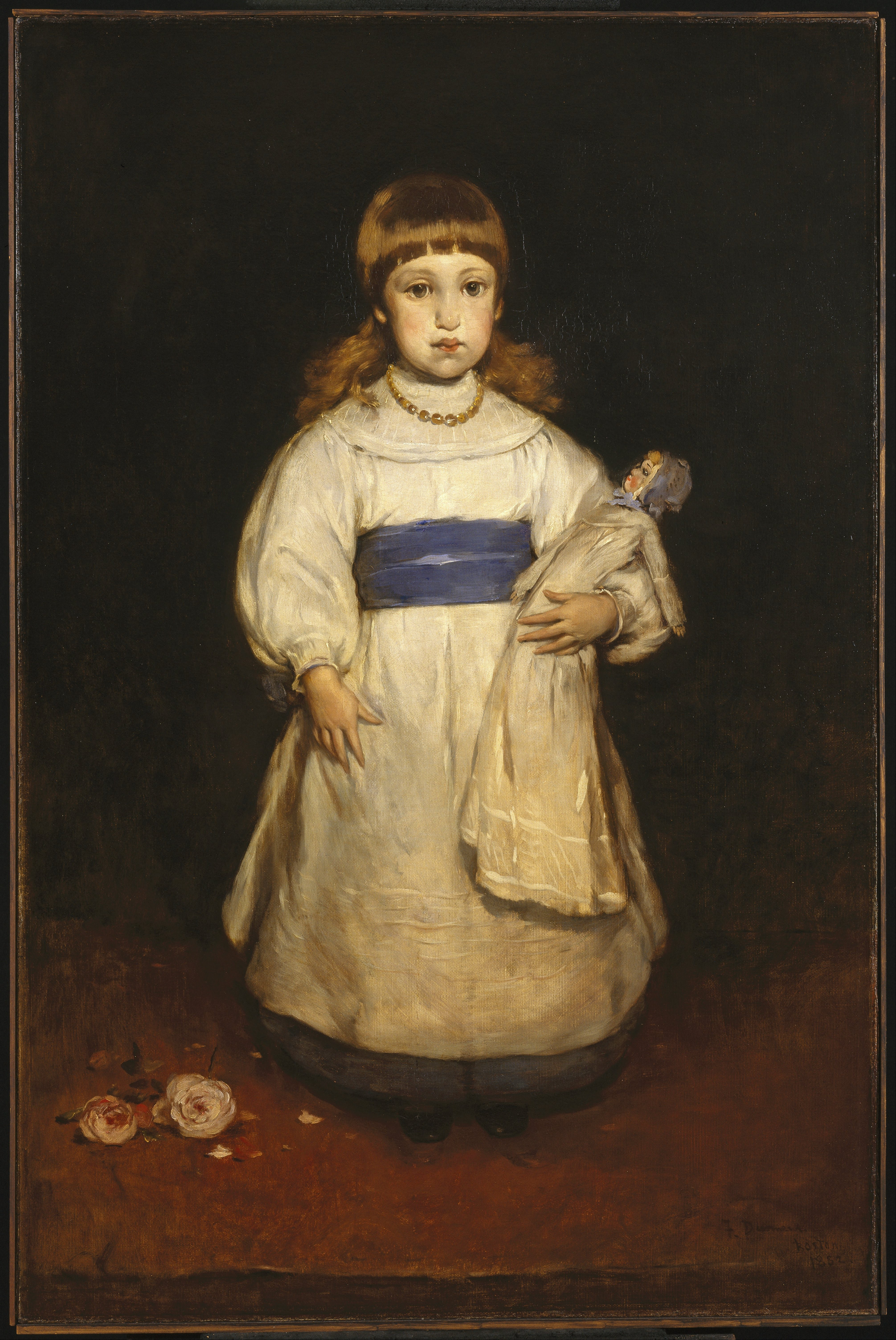
Mary Cabot Wheelwright (1882), Brooklyn Museum

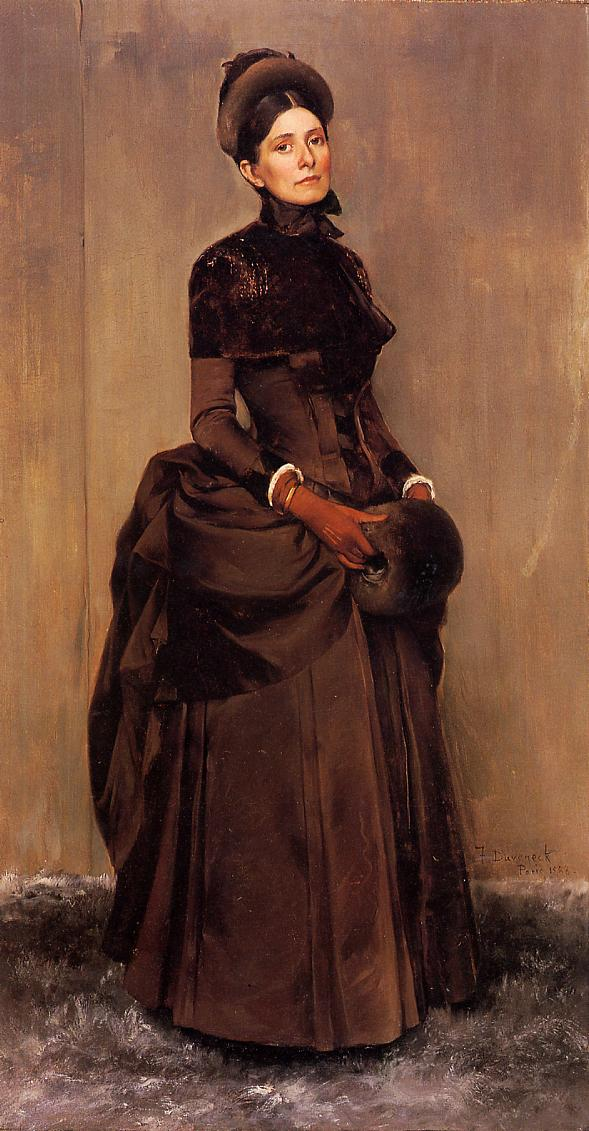
Elizabeth Boott (1887), oil on canvas, Cincinnati Art Museum.

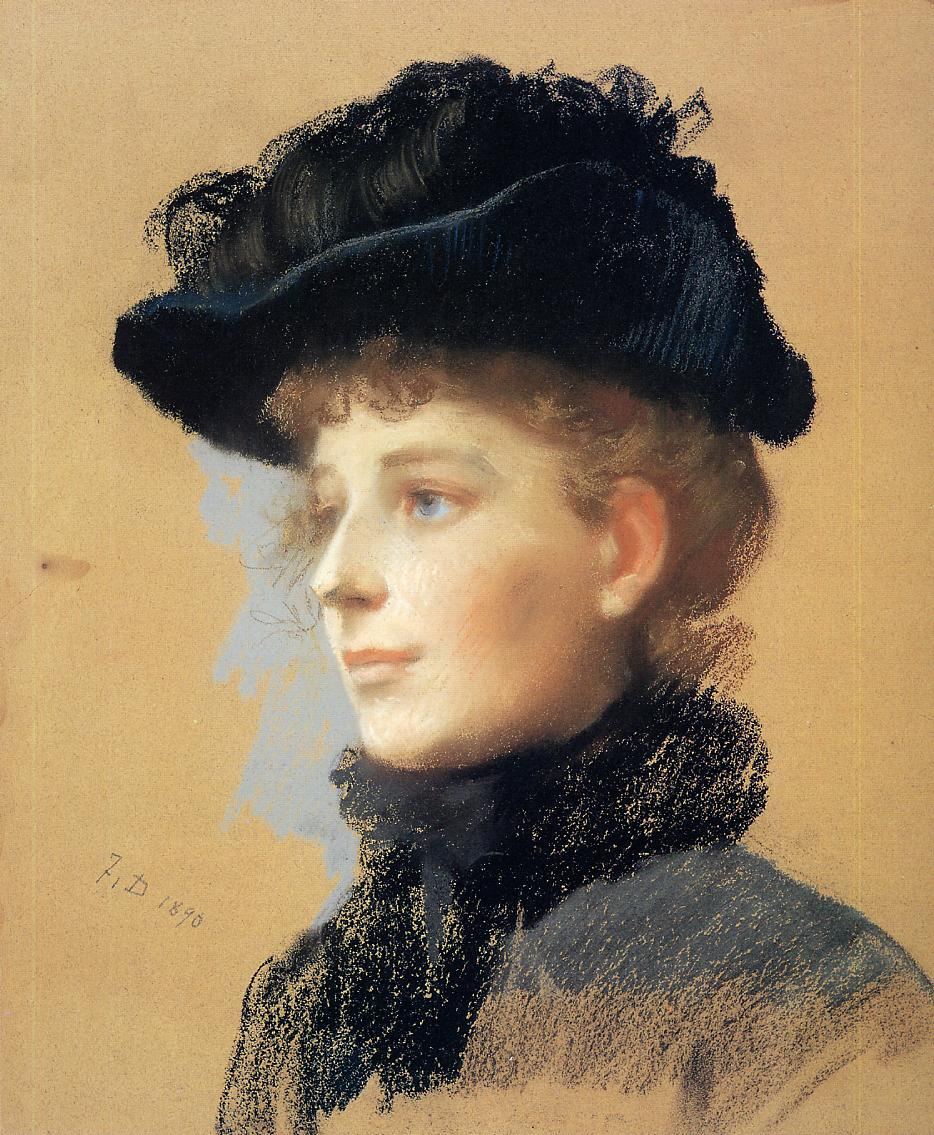
Portrait of a Woman
with Black Hat (1890)

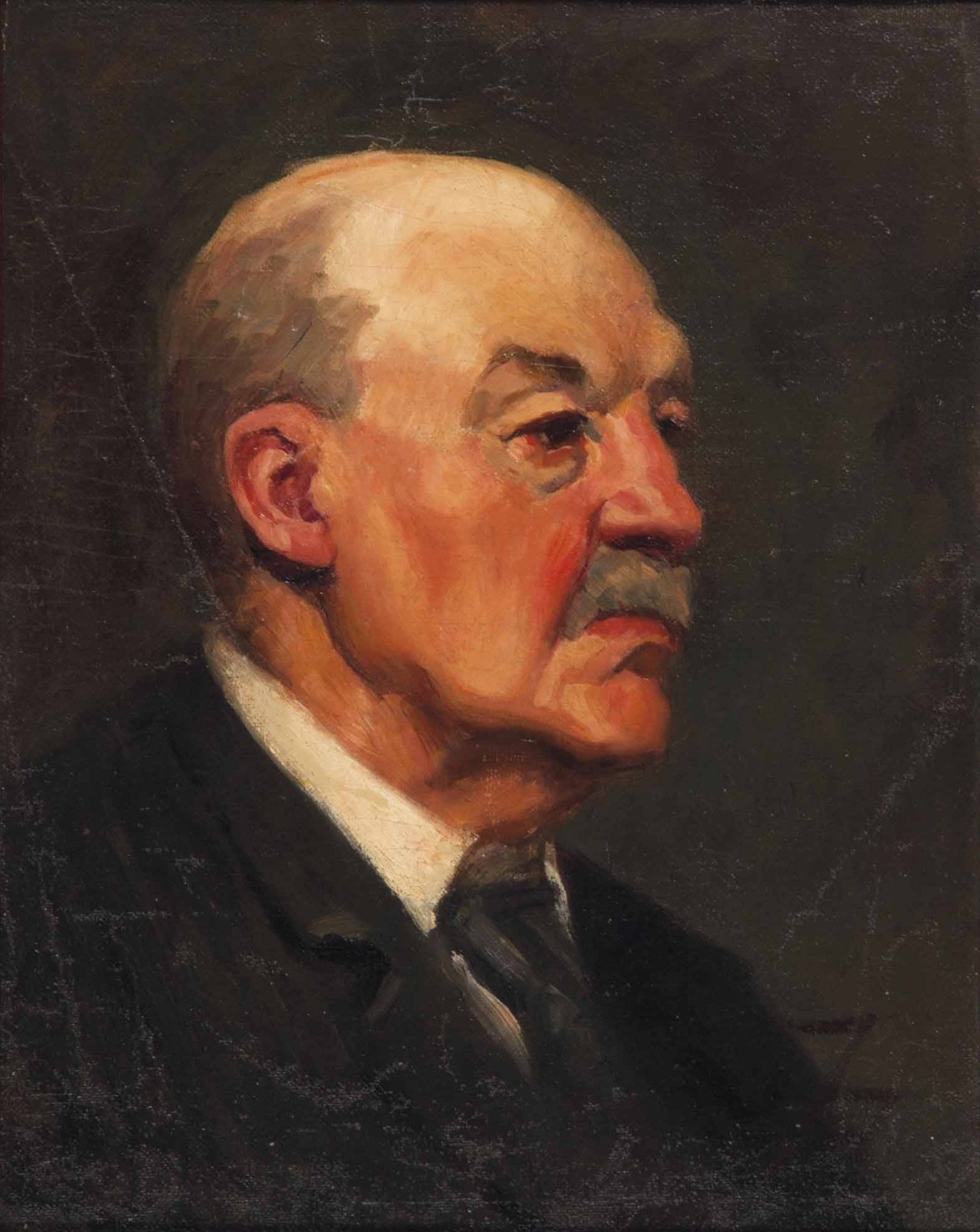
Portrait of Winslow Homer (c. 1890), private collection

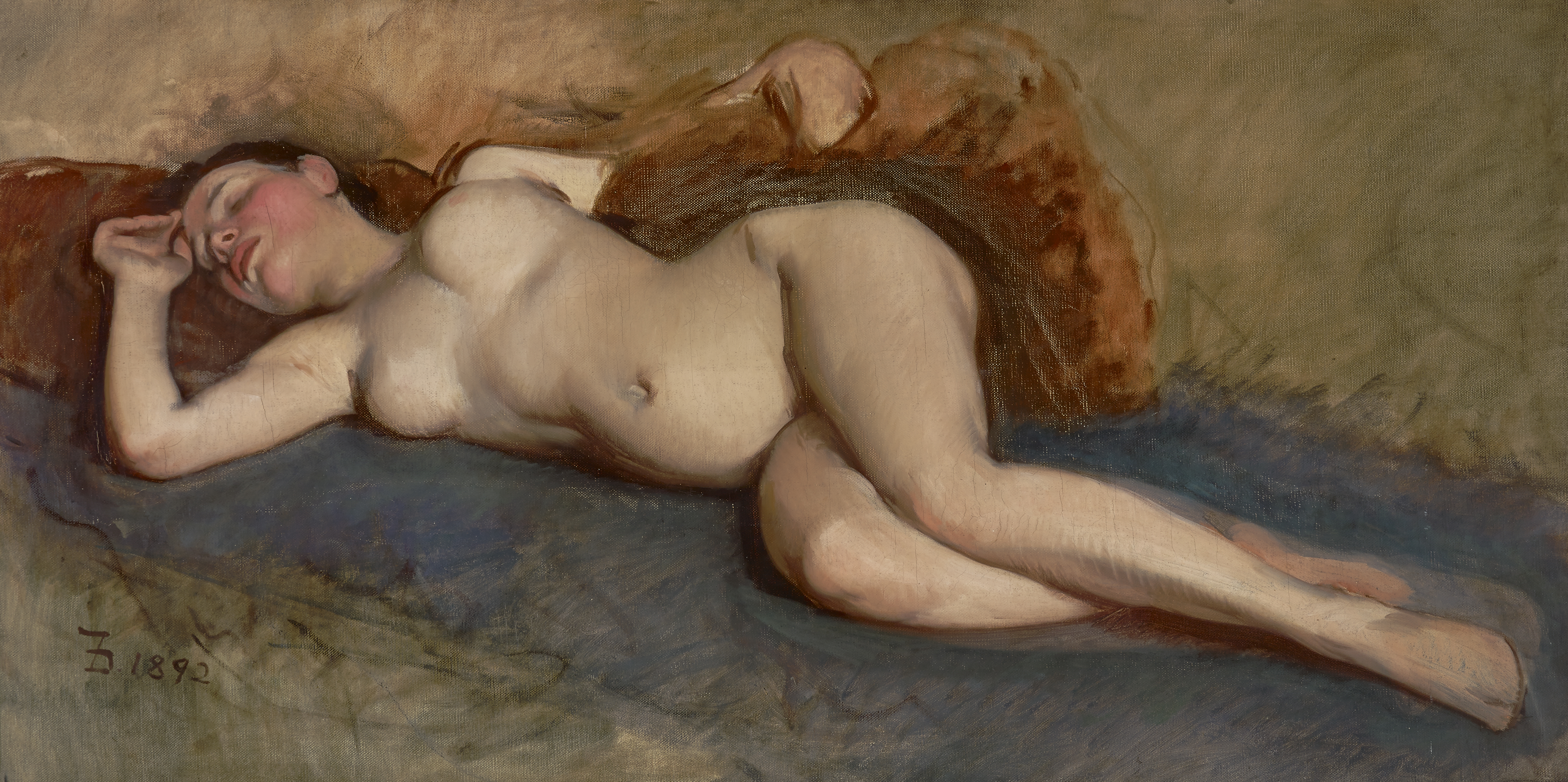
Reclining Nude (1892), oil on canvas, Indianapolis Museum of Art at Newfields
