= List of public art in Cincinnati =

This is a list of public art in Cincinnati, in the United States. This list applies only to works of public art on permanent display in an outdoor public space. For example, this does not include artworks in museums. Public art may include sculptures, statues, monuments, memorials, murals, and mosaics.

Image	Title / subject	Location and coordinates	Date	Artist / designer	Type	Material	Dimensions	Designation	Owner / administrator	Wikidata	Notes
	Aggravation de l'Espace	Central Parkway 39°6′23.81″N 84°31′9.64″W	1980	Jean Boutellis	Sculpture	Steel					
	Big Pig Gig	Throughout Cincinnati	2000, 2012	Multiple local artists	Statues	Fiberglass					A series of public art installations around the city.
More images	Equestrian statue of William Henry Harrison	Piatt Park 39°6′14.65″N 84°31′0.58″W	May 30, 1896	Louis Rebisso	Equestrian statue	Bronze					
More images	Statue of James A. Garfield	Piatt Park	1886	Charles Henry Niehaus	Statue	Bronze					
	Open End	Springfield Township, Hamilton County, Ohio, United States	August 1984	Clement Meadmore	Silicon bronze	steel sheet meta	3.4 m × 2.7 m × 8.38 m (11 ft × 9 ft × 27 ft 6 in)				No longer located in Cincinnati.
More images	Statue of Abraham Lincoln	Lytle Park 39°6′4″N 84°30′15″W	1917	George Grey Barnard	Statue	Bronze					
More images	Tyler Davidson Fountain	Fountain Square 39°6′5.9″N 84°30′44.8″W	1871		Fountain						
