= List of memorials to William Henry Harrison =

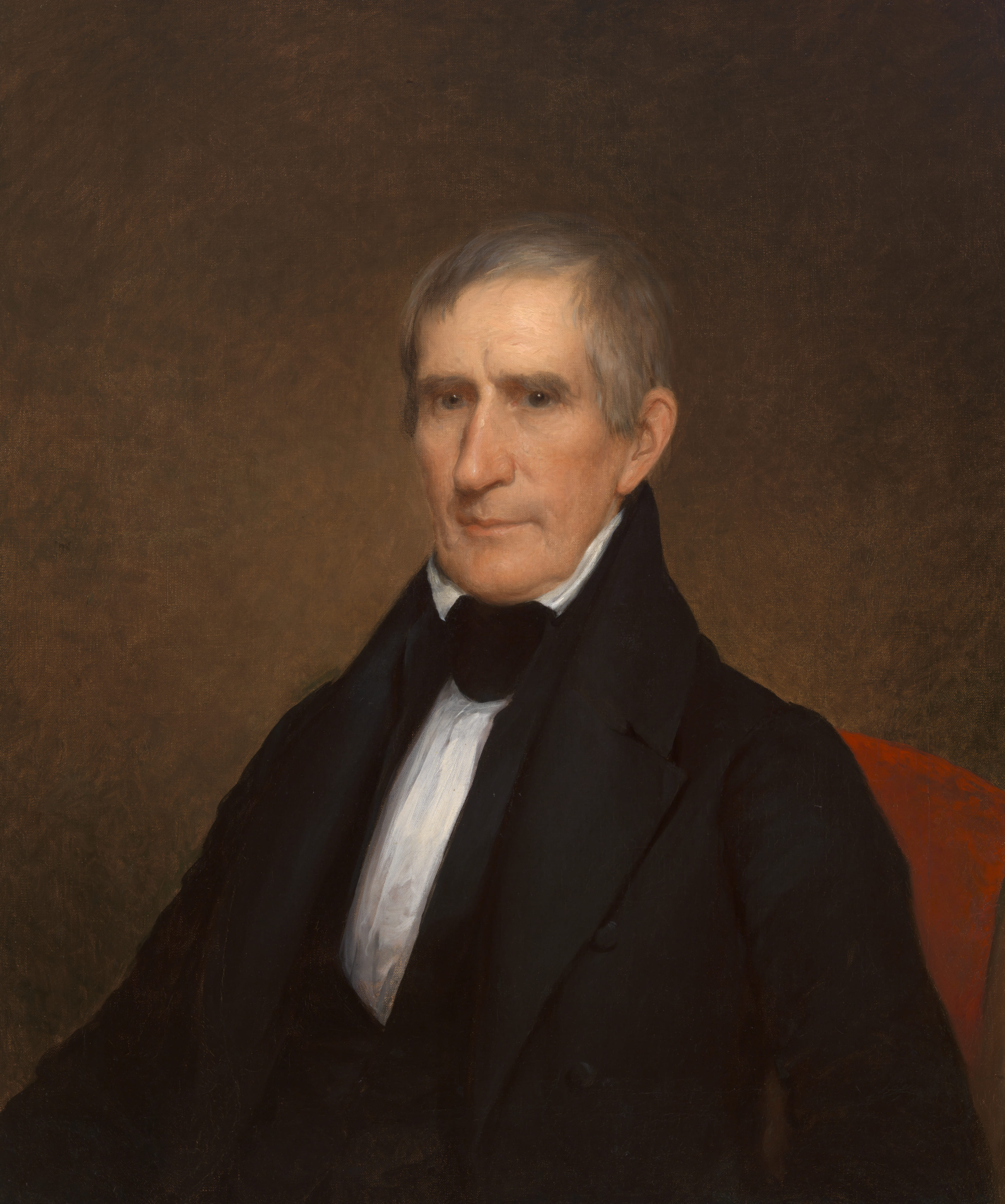
William Henry Harrison

The following is a list of memorials to and things named in honor of William Henry Harrison, the ninth president of the United States.

== Monuments ==
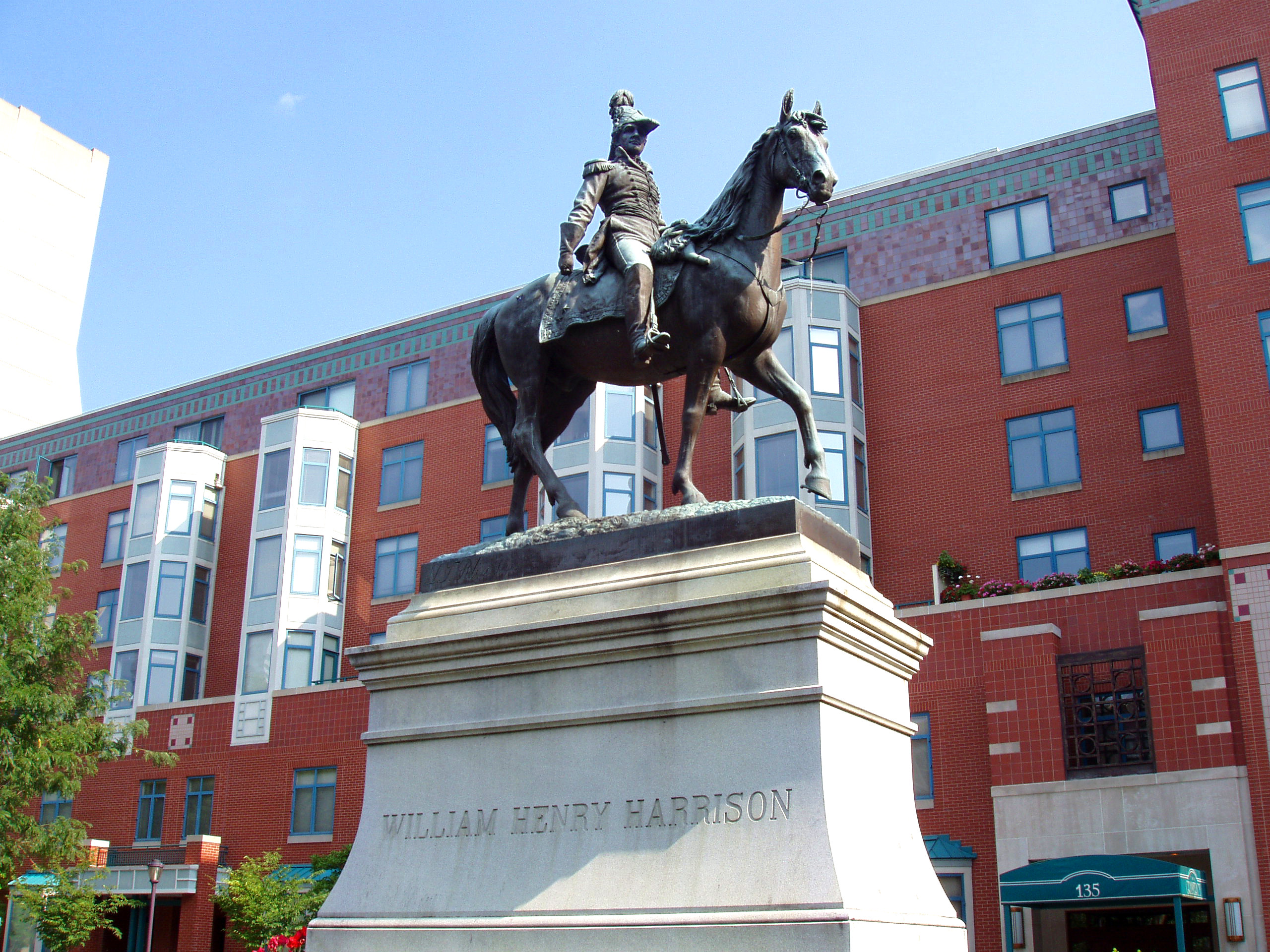
Statue of Harrison on horseback in Cincinnati, Ohio

- A bronze statue of Harrison is one of several erected on Monument Circle, surrounding the Soldiers' and Sailors' Monument in downtown Indianapolis. John H. Mahoney received the commission to create the Harrison statue in 1895; it was completed in 1899.
- A statue of Harrison is part of a granite monument erected in 1908 to commemorate the Battle of Tippecanoe, which took place near the present-day town of Battle Ground, Indiana, in Tippecanoe County.
- A limestone statue of Harrison in civilian attire, created by Harold "Dugan" Elgar, was initially erected in 1972 on the campus of Vincennes University in Vincennes, Indiana; however, the statue was damaged and placed in storage until 2002, when it was mounted in front of the school's Matthew Welsh Administration building.
- A limestone-relief carving of Harrison by Larry Beisler is part of a sculpture in front of the Harrison County, Indiana, visitors' center. The sculpture was dedicated in 2001.
- The Ten O'Clock Line Monument by sculptor Frederick L. Hollis in Owen County, Indiana, commemorates a treaty signed in 1809. Harrison is one of the two central figures in the limestone monument, which was completed in 1957; the other figure depicts Chief Little Turtle of the Miami people.
- Harrison is one of three figures depicted in the north and south pediments of the Tippecanoe County Courthouse in Lafayette, Indiana; the other two figures in the pediments depict Tecumseh and the Marquis de Lafayette.
- A bronze statue of a uniformed General Harrison on horseback was dedicated in 1896 in Cincinnati's Piatt Park.Louis T. Rebisso of the Cincinnati School of Design and his student, Clement Barnhorn, created the work. "Ohio's First President" is inscribed on the north side of the pedestal; the south side includes an inscription of his name. The statue, which is notable for being the only equestrian monument in Cincinnati, is unusual because there is no saddle on the horse, so the stirrups appear to be airborne. The monument originally faced east, toward Vine Street, but it was moved in 1988 to its present location facing west, toward the Covenant First Presbyterian Church across Elm Street.

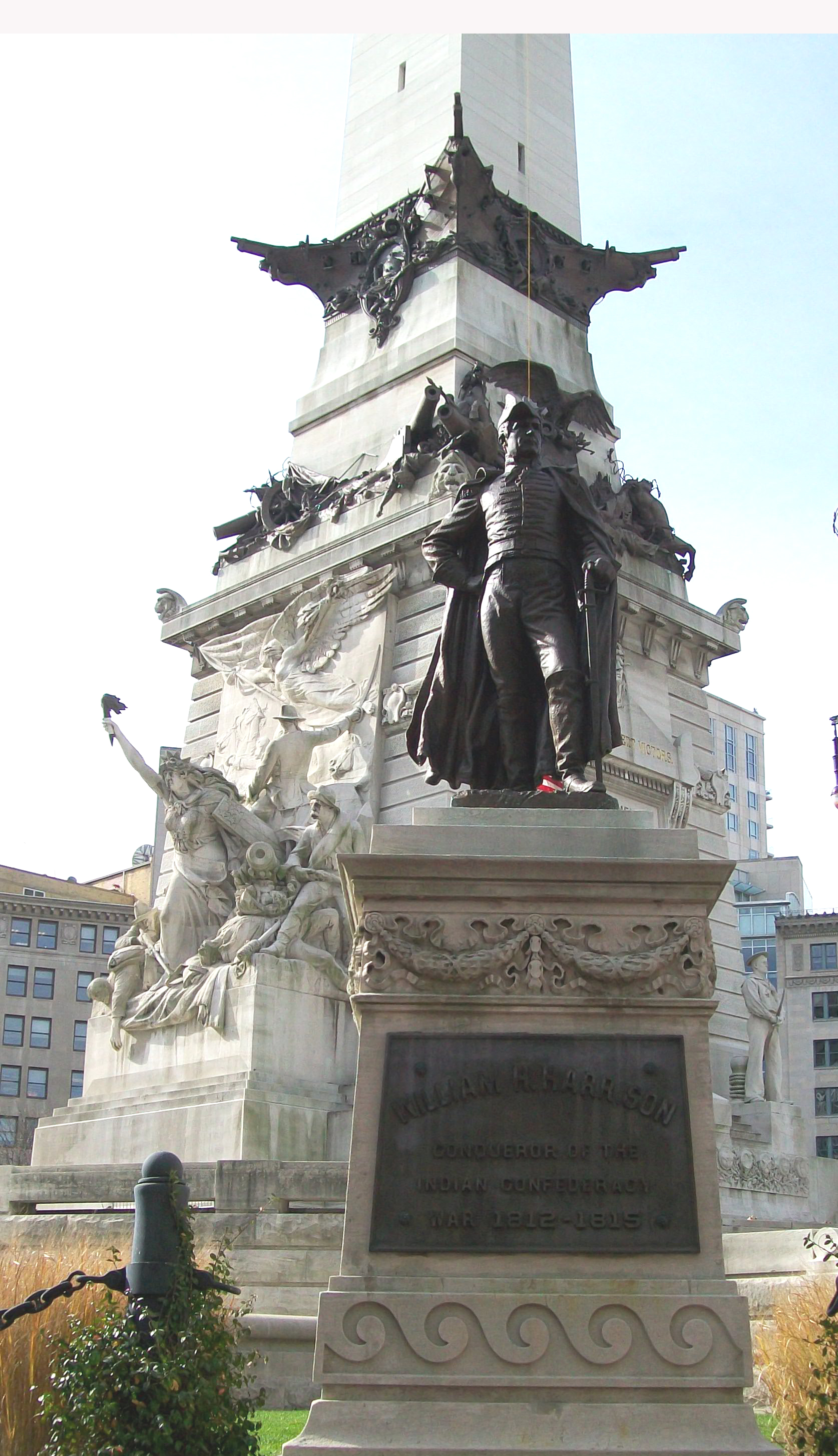
Statue of Harrison at the Soldiers' and Sailors' Monument in Indianapolis

- A statue of Harrison is located at 731 St. Joseph St. in Rapid City, South Dakota. It is one of many statues of presidents on street corners in the city.

== Towns and counties ==
Numerous places have been named in Harrison's honor:

- Harrison, Michigan
- Harrison, New Jersey
- Harrison, Ohio
- Tipp City, Ohio (formerly Tippecanoe City)
- Tippecanoe, Ohio
- Harrison, Tennessee
- Harrison County, Indiana
- Harrison County, Mississippi
- Harrison County, Iowa
- Harrison County, Ohio

== Schools ==
- At least three schools have been named in Harrison's honor: William Henry Harrison High School in Evansville, William Henry Harrison High School in West Lafayette, Indiana, and William Henry Harrison High in Harrison, Ohio).

== Other ==
- William Henry Harrison Park in Pemberville, Ohio, was near the site of one of General Harrison's Northwestern Army military encampments during the War of 1812.
- Camp Harrison was a Union Army military post near Cincinnati during the American Civil War.
- Fort William Henry Harrison, a military fort in Montana, was initially named Fort Harrison in 1892 to honor President Benjamin Harrison, the twenty-third president, but the fort was renamed in 1906 as a tribute to William Henry Harrison, the ninth president, after it was discovered that a U.S. Army fort in Indianapolis had already been named in honor of Benjamin Harrison.
- William H. H. Island is an island located in Lake Harner, a recreational park near Lafayette, Indiana.

== In popular culture ==
- James Seay portrays Harrison in the 1952 Technicolor western film, Brave Warrior, which is based on events of the War of 1812 and the Battle of Tippecanoe. Jay Silverheels, best known for his role as Tonto in the popular television series, The Lone Ranger, portrays Tecumseh, Harrison's adversary.
- DEFA, the state-owned East German studio released the red western film, Tecumseh, in 1972, with Wolfgang Greese in the role of Governor Harrison.
- Tecumseh!, an outdoor stage drama, has been running since 1973 near Chillicothe, Ohio, at the Sugarloaf Mountain Amphitheatre. Allan W. Eckert, a novelist/historian and a seven-time Pulitzer Prize nominee and an Emmy recipient, wrote the play, which centers on the life of Tecumseh and depicts interactions between the Shawnee leader and Harrison in the early nineteenth century.
- Tecumseh: The Last Warrior, a 1995 TNT Network film about Tecumseh's life, is based on James Alexander Thom's book, Panther in the Sky. The documentary was produced, in part, by Francis Ford Coppola; it was filmed near Winston-Salem, North Carolina. David Clennon portrays Harrison.
- Dwier Brown, best known for his role in the 1989 film, Field of Dreams, portrays Harrison in "Tecumseh's Vision", episode 2 of the PBS mini-series documentary, We Shall Remain (2009).
- On January 20, 2015, the American television sitcom, Parks and Recreation, aired "William Henry Harrison" (season 7, episode 3), which centers on a visit to a fictionalized version of the William Henry Harrison Museum at Grouseland. The set included a reproduction of the tin ball used in Harrison's 1840 presidential campaign that inspired the idiom, "keep the ball rolling"

== See also ==
- Presidential memorials in the United States

== Bibliography ==
- Greiff, Glory-June (2005). Remembrance, Faith and Fancy: Outdoor Public Sculpture in Indiana. Indianapolis: Indiana Historical Society Press. ISBN 0-87195-180-0.
