= Ulysses S. Grant Monument =

Monument in Lincoln Park, Chicago, Illinois

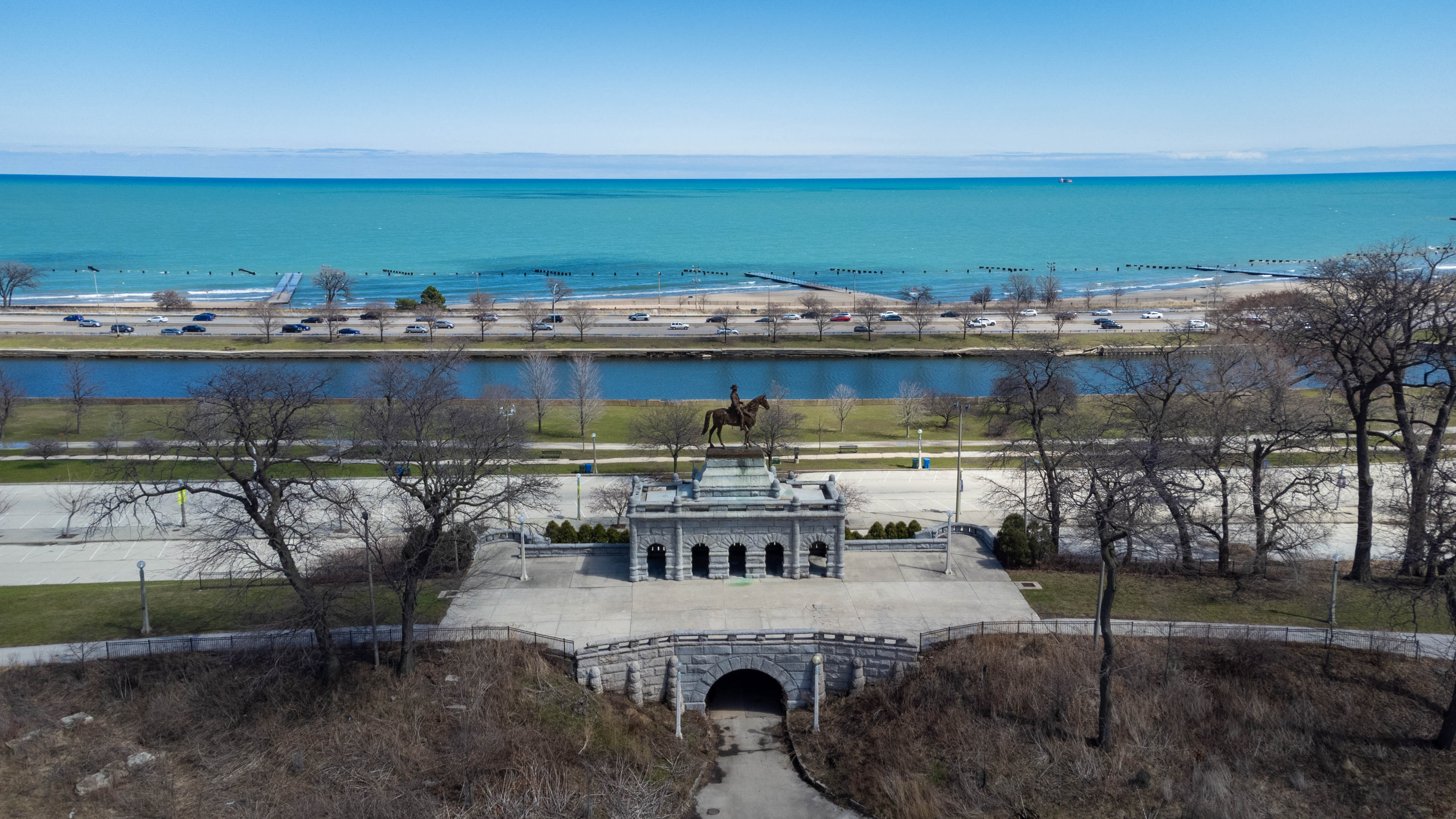
- The Grant monument, April 2022
- Interactive map of Ulysses S. Grant Monument
- Location: Lincoln Park, Chicago
- Coordinates: 41.9176°N 87.6308°W
- Designer: Louis Rebisso
- Type: Presidential memorial
- Material: Bronze, granite base
- Height: 60 ft 9 in (18.52 m)
- Beginning date: 1885
- Completion date: 1891
- Dedicated date: October 7, 1891
- Dedicated to: Ulysses S. Grant
- Website: Official website

The Ulysses S. Grant Monument is a presidential memorial in Chicago, honoring American Civil War general and 18th president of the United States, Ulysses S. Grant. Located in Lincoln Park, the statue was commissioned shortly after the president's death in 1885 and was completed in 1891. Several artists submitted sketches, and Louis Rebisso was selected to design the statue, with a granite pedestal suggested by William Le Baron Jenney. At the time of its completion, the monument was the largest bronze statue cast in the United States, and over 250,000 people were present at the dedication of the monument.

In 2021, Mayor of Chicago Lori Lightfoot announced that Grant, as well as 40 other statues and dedications in the Chicago area, were under review for possible removal. The Grant Monument's inclusion in this list has been met with criticism from academics, politicians, and journalists.

== Description ==
The Grant Monument is situated in Lincoln Park in Chicago, Illinois. Within the park, it sits just west of N. Cannon Drive, between W. Fullerton Avenue and E. North Avenue. The monument itself is an equestrian statue of Ulysses S. Grant, dressed in his American Civil War uniform and designed by Cincinnati sculptor Louis Rebisso. Rebisso had already come into prominence for his equestrian sculptures of James Birdseye McPherson in Washington and of William Henry Harrison in his hometown of Cincinnati. After Rebisso's preliminary sketch was chosen for the monument, the trustees of the Chicago Grant Monument Fund provided him with authentic memorabilia, such as a riding saddle and hat that had belonged to the general, in order to ensure an authentic statue representation. The statue stands 18 feet 3 inches (5.56 m) tall, and was cast in bronze by Chicopee Bronze Works. It consists of 22 metal pieces fashioned together to give the appearance of a singular piece. At the time of its creation, the statue was the largest one of its kind cast in the United States; while the Virginia Washington Monument was larger, it was cast in Munich and imported to the US.

Noted skyscraper architect William Le Baron Jenney initially proposed that the bronze memorial statue should be fashioned atop an arched structure in the Romanesque style. The equestrian statue sits atop a solid granite pedestal, which itself is divided into three parts. The pedestal terrace runs parallel to Lake Shore Drive and stands 16 feet (4.9 m) tall. Above that is a granite superstructure, standing another 16 feet (4.9 m) tall and consisting of a stone roof and balustrade. Finally, there is a 10 feet 6 inches (3.20 m) pedestal proper. The total height of the granite pedestal is 42 feet 6 inches (12.95 m), and it was designed by the architectural firm of Burling & Whitehouse.

Fellow sculptors, as well as Grant's family, largely praised the design of the monument. His widow, Julia Dent, praised the early photographs of the project, while his oldest son, Frederick Dent Grant, oversaw the sculpting process. The Illustrated American called the statue "very good on the whole", with "the figure of the general ... particularly strong and well modelled", although there was some criticism for the detailing on the horse. Ellve Howell Glover of The International declared the monument "magnificent" in 1898, and "a most lifelike representation of the figure of Grant". Some criticism came from sculptor Lorado Taft, who in 1921 declared the monument to be "a nondescript pile of masonry", topped by a statue which matched its base in "a complete lack of artistic distinction".

== History ==
=== Creation and dedication ===
President Grant died on July 23, 1885, of throat cancer, at the age of 63. That same day, Illinois businessman Potter Palmer proposed to General Joseph Stockton, who had fought alongside Grant during the Vicksburg campaign, that there should be a statue to the recently deceased president in Chicago. Within three days, the pair had collected $21,000; within one month, the fund had amassed $65,000 in private subscription. After collecting the funds, over a dozen artists contributed design proposals to the project, from which Rebisso's design was ultimately chosen.

The project suffered a number of delays. Rebisso not only fell ill for several months, but he grew tired of his work partway through the project. At one point, the original mold for the bronze casting was broken and needed to be replaced. The monument was finally completed and dedicated on October 7, 1891. While exact attendance numbers vary, it is generally agreed that at least 250,000 Americans attended the Grant Memorial Day. At the time, this number would have been equivalent to at least one in four Chicagoans. One attendee was Julia Dent, in a rare public appearance after the death of her husband. The dedication was accompanied by a banquet and parade, provided by the Army of the Tennessee, while Horace Porter delivered a eulogy.

=== 20th century ===
In 1958, a military history organization known as the Civil War Round Table recommended that the monument be moved to nearby Grant Park, but the park board denied this request after learning it would cost $230,000 (equivalent to $2,370,000 in 2022) to complete the move. In the mid-1990s, the Chicago Park District fully conserved the monument, a process which included cleaning and treating both the sculpture and pedestal, as well as installing new lighting.

=== 21st century ===
On February 17, 2021, Mayor of Chicago Lori Lightfoot announced that, in an effort to confront the "hard truths of Chicago's racial history", 41 statues, plaques, and works of public art within the city were to be placed under review for possible removal by the Chicago Monuments Project. A potential rationale for the removal of the Grant Monument was that his "American Indian policies were well intentioned, but ultimately disastrous".

Lightfoot's decision was met with widespread criticism from historians and other government officials. John O. McGinnis, a professor at Northwestern University Pritzker School of Law, pushed back against the monument's potential removal, saying that "[n]o general was more responsible for the Union's victory in the Civil War than was Grant." Kate Masur, another professor at Northwestern, argued against the "well intentioned, but ultimately disastrous" label, saying instead that Grant's personal policy towards American Indians was progressive for its time, and was hindered by other government officials. Tim Butler and Darin LaHood, members of the Illinois House of Representatives, both argued at once against the removal of statues dedicated to Grant or to Abraham Lincoln, as did the editorial board of the Chicago Tribune.

== See also ==
- Bust of Ulysses S. Grant (San Francisco)
