= McPherson Square =

Square in Washington, D.C., United States

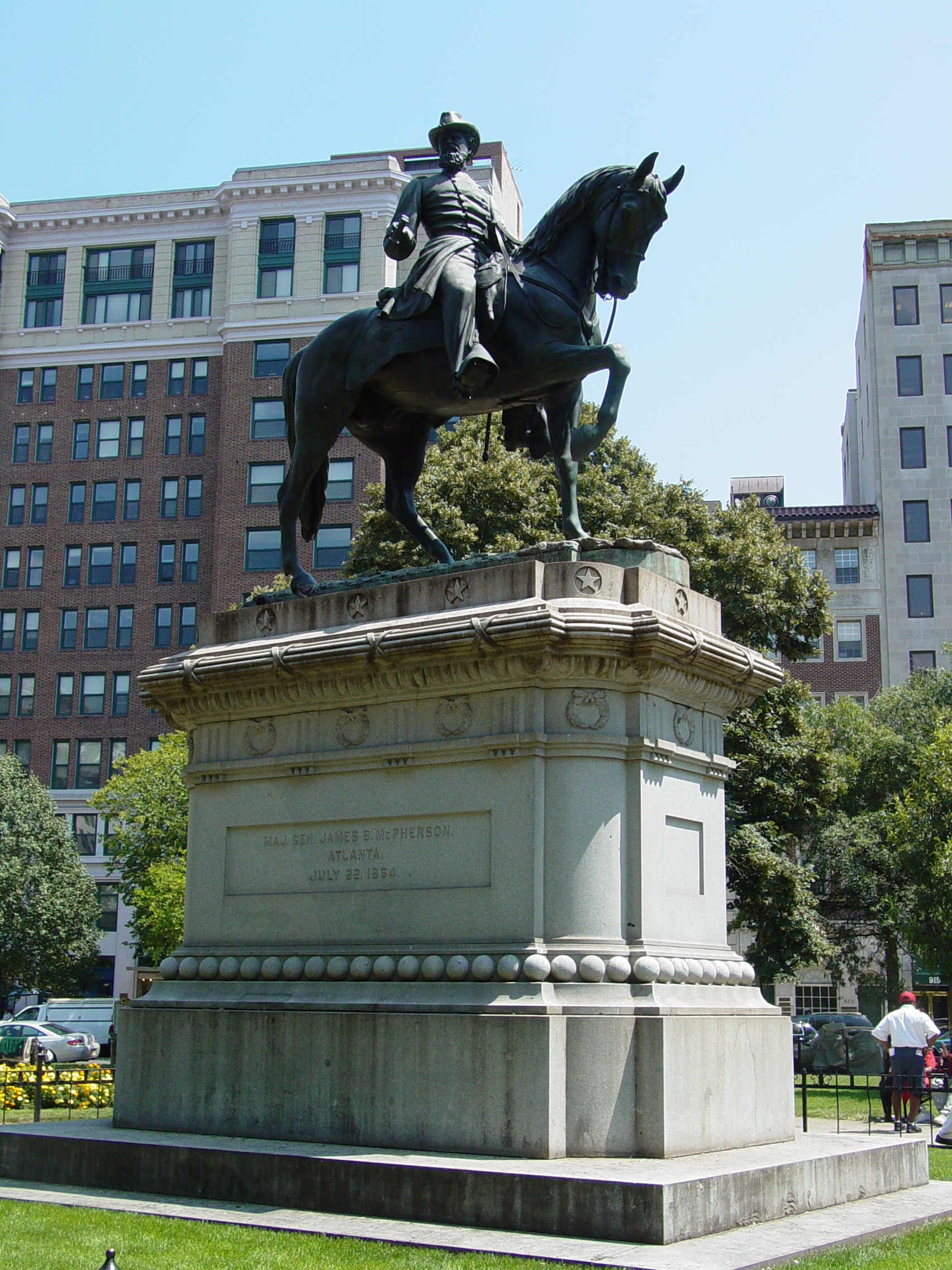
- The Major General James B. McPherson Memorial located in McPherson Square
- Interactive map of McPherson Square
- Coordinates: 38°54′7.05″N 77°2′2.85″W
- Public transit: McPherson Square

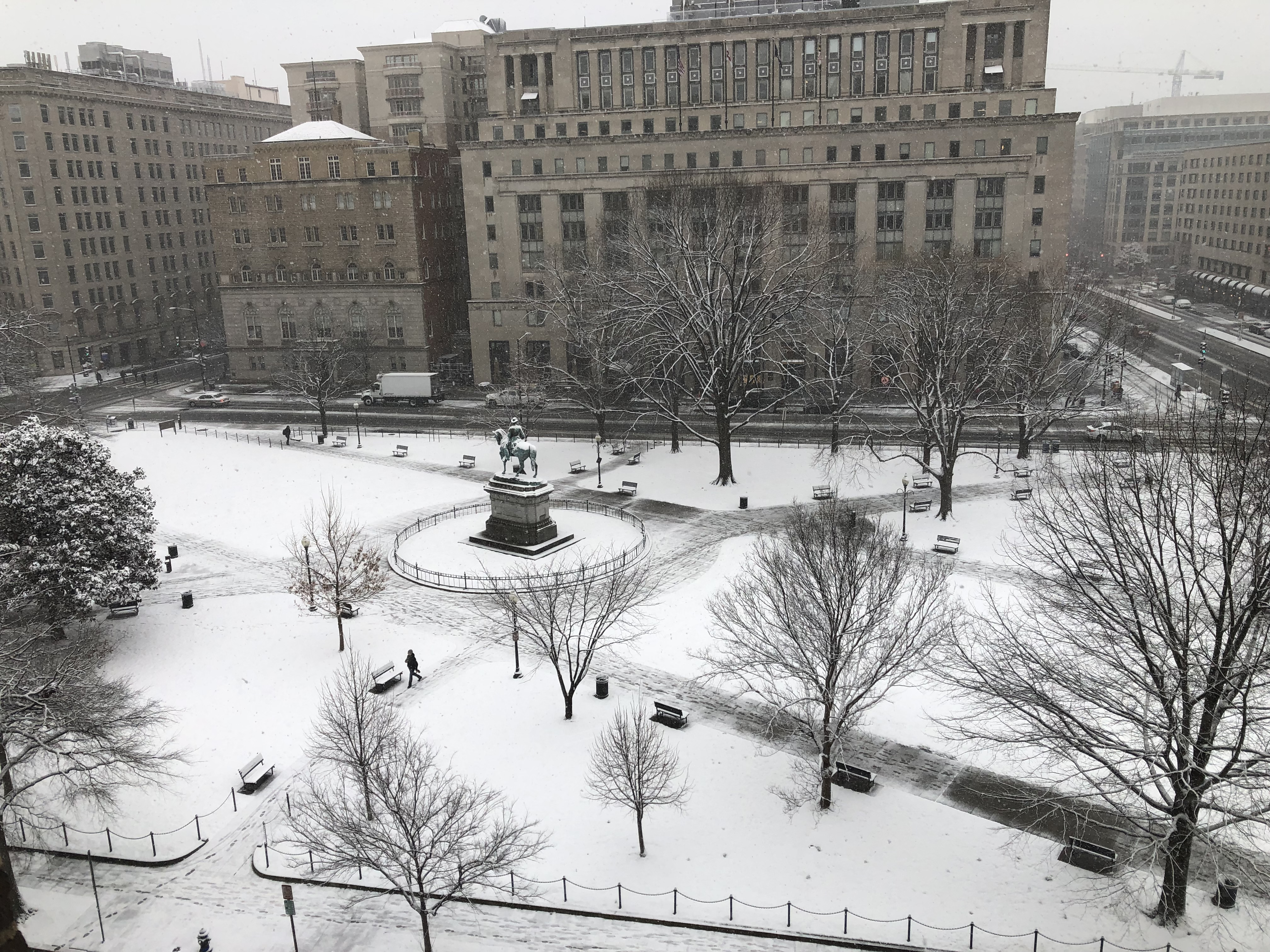
McPherson Square in winter

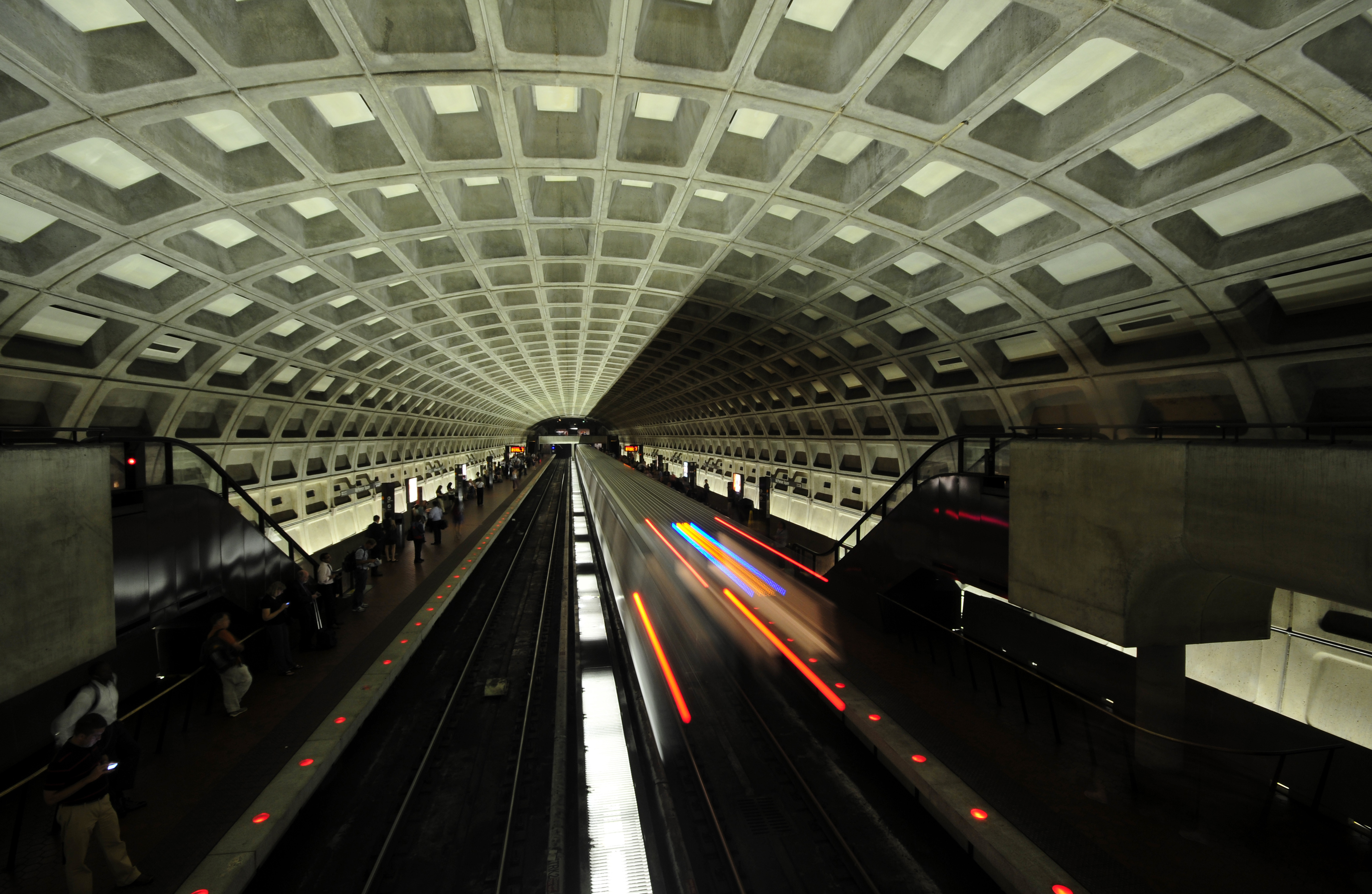
The McPherson Square station on the Washington Metro

McPherson Square is a public square in downtown Washington, D.C. It is bound by K Street Northwest to the north, Vermont Avenue NW on the East, I Street NW on the south, and 15th Street NW on the West; it is one block northeast of Lafayette Park. It is the sister square of Farragut Square two blocks west. It is served by the McPherson Square station of the Washington Metro.

== Statue ==
The Society of the Army of the Tennessee presented an equestrian statue of McPherson, which was erected at McPherson Square and dedicated on October 18, 1876. The sculpture portrays McPherson surveying a battlefield. It was made by Louis Rebisso out of a captured cannon and rests on a granite pedestal.

== History ==
McPherson Square was part of Pierre L'Enfant's plan of 1791 for the city. The park-like area is named after James B. McPherson, a major general who fought in the Union Army during the American Civil War before he was killed at the Battle of Atlanta.

On October 1, 2011, Occupy D.C. encamped in McPherson Square. On February 4, 2012, United States Park Police officers, citing no-camping statutes, evicted the occupiers.

For many years, McPherson Square endured a substantial homeless camp. In February 2023, the D.C. government and federal government acted to remove all homeless people from the square, despite grassroots opposition. The government argued that the encampments were dangerous, citing an increase in violent incidents, drug use, and criminal activity. Activists countered by arguing that the government was not giving the homeless population a good alternative, and were leaving them with little support while closing down several of their encampments across the city.

== Scene ==
The square is frequented by area workers, street vendors, and restaurant-goers during the day, and homeless people at night. Due to its proximity to the White House, it is the site of political rallies and falls on the path of various protest marches. Adjacent buildings include the U.S. Department of Veterans Affairs, the Lafayette Building housing the Export-Import Bank, the 15th Street financial district, as well as numerous hotels.
