= Equestrian statue of James B. McPherson =

Statue in Washington, D.C.

Major General James B. McPherson
- Brigadier General James B. McPherson
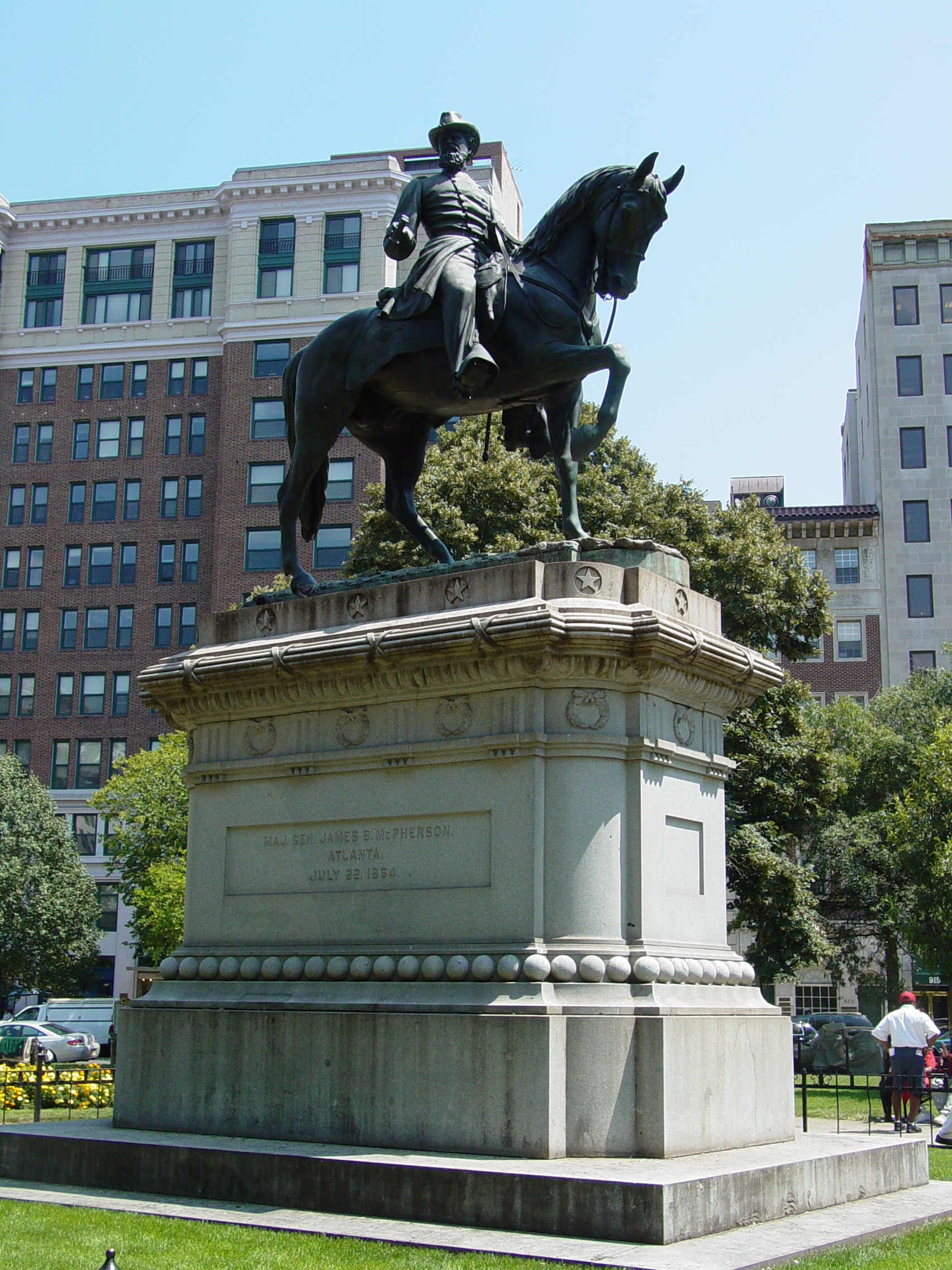
- Statue in 2005
- Artist: Louis Rebisso
- Year: 1876
- Type: Bronze
- Dimensions: 430 cm × 370 cm (168 in × 144 in)
- Location: Washington, D.C.
- Owner: National Park Service
- Equestrian statue of James B. McPherson
- U.S. National Register of Historic Places
- U.S. Historic district – Contributing property
- Location within Washington, D.C.
- Location: Washington, D.C.
- Coordinates: 38°54′7.05″N 77°2′2.85″W
- Part of: Civil War Monuments in Washington, DC.
- NRHP reference No.: 78000257
- Added to NRHP: September 20, 1978

Major General James B. McPherson is a public artwork by American artist Louis Rebisso, located at McPherson Square in Washington, D.C., United States. Major General James B. McPherson was originally surveyed as part of the Smithsonian's Save Outdoor Sculpture! survey in 1993. The monument is a bronze equestrian statue of Civil War hero James B. McPherson. The statue is a contributing monument to the Civil War Monuments in Washington, DC, of the National Register of Historic Places.

== Description ==
The memorial shows General McPherson sitting upon a horse, turned slightly to the proper right as if surveying a battlefield. He is holding the horses reins in his proper left hand and a pair of field glasses in his proper right hand. His horse, caught in mid-stride, walks with its proper right foot raised and its head turned down. The statue sits upon a rectangular granite base (H. 12 ft (4 m)., D. 6 ft (2 m).). The base is adorned with a ring of small wreaths around the top and a ring of stars around the bottom, along with a ring of cannonballs.

The west side of the base is inscribed with:

MAJ. GEN. JAMES B. McPHERSON

ATLANTA

JULY 22, 1864

The east side of the base is inscribed with:

ERECTED BY HIS COMRADES
OF THE SOCIETY OF
THE ARMY OF THE TENNESSEE

== Information ==
Confederate cannons that were captured at the Battle of Atlanta were used in the casting of the piece. The base was designed by Smithmeyer & Pelz and Westham Granite Works provided the stone work.

The sculpture was authorized by the United States Congress on March 3, 1875, and was paid for by the Society of the Army of the Tennessee. Major General James B. McPherson was installed in Scott Square (now McPherson Square) on October 18, 1876, on the 11th annual reunion of the Army of the Tennessee.

== Condition ==
This sculpture was surveyed in June 1993 for its condition and was decided that it was "well maintained."

== See also ==
- List of public art in Washington, D.C., Ward 2
