= William Jacob Baer =

American painter

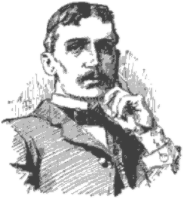

Personal details
- Born: January 29, 1860 Cincinnati, Ohio
- Died: September 21, 1941 (aged 81) East Orange, New Jersey
- Occupation: Artist

William Jacob Baer (January 29, 1860 – September 21, 1941) was an American artist, considered the foremost American miniature painter.

== Biography ==
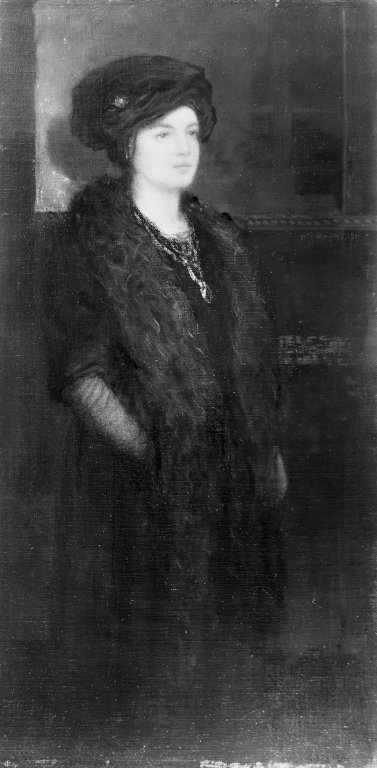
Portrait of a Woman in Black (1911), Brooklyn Museum

William Jacob Baer was born in Cincinnati, Ohio on January 29, 1860. He was a lithographer's apprentice at Donaldson and Company in Cincinnati from 1876 to 1879. During the same period he attended an evening modeling class at the McMicken School of Design, taught by Louis Rebisso. He continued his training in Munich at the Royal Academy from 1880 to 1884, studying oil painting with Ludwig Löfftz. He received medals in all his courses, and the Academy purchased one of his watercolors. In 1913, Baer was elected into the National Academy of Design as an Associate member.

Upon his return to the United States, Baer settled into the Montclair, New Jersey art colony to continue his career as a genre painter, portrait painter, and teacher. He was attracted there by his friend, Alexander Drake (the art editor Scribner’s Monthly). Drake encouraged him to teach a class in engraving and black-and-white draftsmanship for illustrators; class members were dubbed the "Carbonari". In 1888 Baer became the instructor at Round Lake, New York, for summer classes at a Chautauqua-like cultural enterprise to which he remained attached until 1891; in 1893 he took over the classes at Chautauqua itself for several years. In 1892 and '93, he turned from figure painting to miniatures (both portraits and other subjects), initially under the patronage of Alfred Corning Clark, and soon Baer not only became the most renowned miniaturist in the country but also spearheaded the miniature-painting revival that began at that time. He was the first president of the American Society of Miniature Painters, New York.

Baer exhibited at the Chicago Worlds Fair of 1893. In New York and at the Paris Exposition of 1900, Baer was awarded a 1st class medals. He also was a regular exhibitor at the National Academy of Design, N.Y., the Chicago Art Institute and the Pennsylvania Academy of Fine Art. Among his miniatures are The Golden Hour, Daphne, In Arcadia, and Madonna with the Auburn Hair. In 1913, Baer was elected into the National Academy of Design as an Associate member.

Baer died in East Orange, New Jersey on September 21, 1941.

== Gallery ==
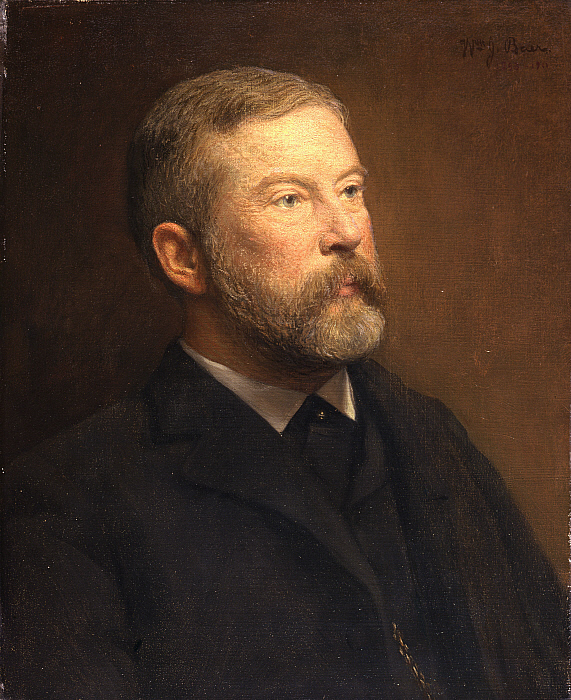
Alfred Corning Clark (1893 and 1911), Oil on canvas, 22 1/16 x 18 in. (56 x 45.7 cm) Clark Art Institute
