= Covenant First Presbyterian Church =

Church in Cincinnati, Ohio, US

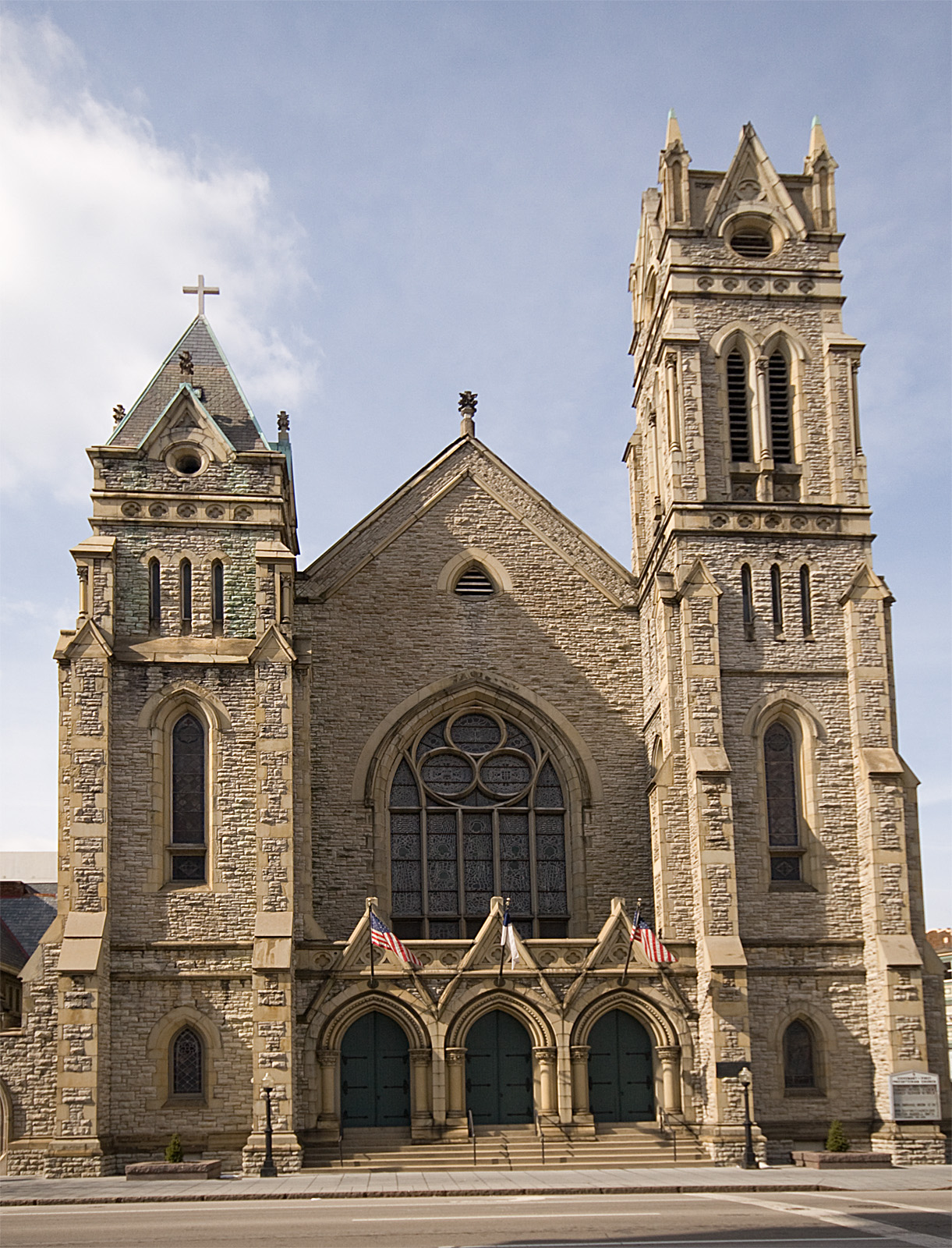
- Front of the church
- Covenant First Presbyterian Church
- Location: (United States) Cincinnati, Ohio, USA
- Denomination: Presbyterian
- Website: Covenant First Presbyterian Church

History
- Former name(s): First Presbyterian; Covenant Presbyterian
- Founded: 1933

Architecture
- Style: Gothic
- Covenant First Presbyterian Church
- U.S. National Register of Historic Places
- Cincinnati Local Historic Landmark
- Location within Ohio Location within the United States
- Coordinates: 39°6′14″N 84°31′2″W
- Built: 1875
- Architect: William Walter; J.J. Cotteral & Son
- NRHP reference No.: 73001455
- Added to NRHP: January 29, 1973

The Covenant First Presbyterian Church is a congregation of the Presbyterian Church (USA) located at 717 Elm Street at Eighth Street and Garfield Place in Cincinnati, Ohio. Two churches, the First Presbyterian and Covenant Presbyterian merged in the 1933 to become the Covenant First Presbyterian Church.

The first Presbyterian Church in Cincinnati was on the north side of Fourth Street near Main and was organized October 16, 1790.

== History ==
Covenant First Presbyterian Church traces its lineage to the Cincinnati-Columbia Presbyterian Church, established by David Rice on October 16, 1790. The first pastor was James Kemper, whose personal log cabin is preserved in Sharon Woods Park in Sharonville. The original church, built in 1791, consisted of a frame with logs for pews. After Kemper's resignation in 1796, some church members left, while those who chose to stay in Cincinnati reorganized as the First Presbyterian Church. First Presbyterian purchased a plot of land on West Fourth Street from John Cleves Symmes in 1797 for $16. A new church was built in 1815 for at least $16,000. In 1851, First Presbyterian built another church at the intersection of Fourth and Main Streets in the neo-Gothic style. Its spire, topped by a golden hand pointing towards Heaven, stood 285 feet tall.

The Second Presbyterian Church split from First Presbyterian in 1816. In 1830, Second Presbyterian built a "Grecian"-style church south of Fourth Street between Race and Vine Streets. In 1833, Lyman Beecher was called as pastor of Second Presbyterian and president of Lane Theological Seminary. Beecher had a falling out with Joshua Wilson, the pastor of First Presbyterian. Wilson eventually charged Beecher with heresy over Beecher's support of the New School. Though Wilson later withdrew the charges, Beecher left Cincinnati in 1843. After moving to various locations in downtown Cincinnati, Second Presbyterian settled into the present location at the corner of 8th and Elm streets. Henry van Dyke preached the sermon for the dedication of the sanctuary on April 11, 1875. Second Presbyterian was renamed Presbyterian Church of the Covenant after absorbing the Fifth and Central churches in 1909.

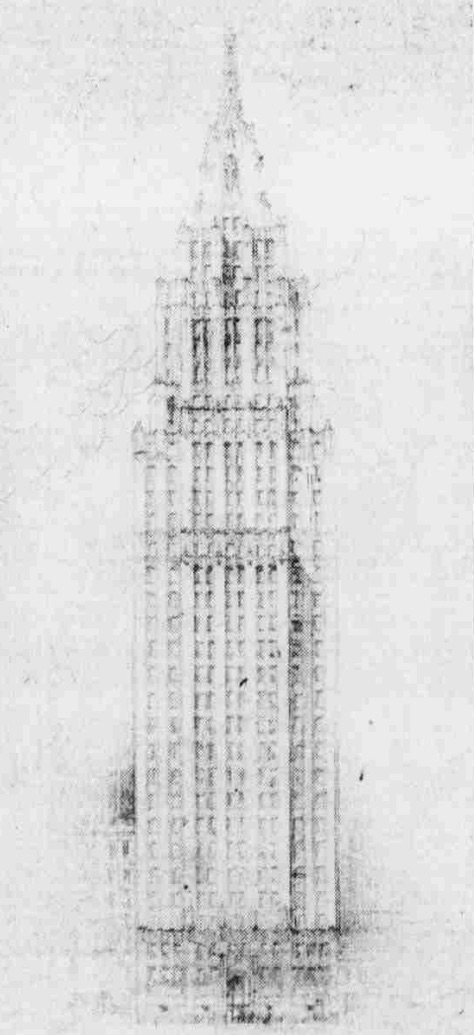
1929 sketch of Temple Tower, published in The Cincinnati Enquirer

In 1914, Reformed Presbyterian merged with First Presbyterian, which also absorbed West Liberty Presbyterian in 1928. In 1929, First Presbyterian's 1851 church was valued at $1.3 million ($24.4 million in 2025). In August of that year, First Presbyterian announced plans to replace its church with a 40-story, 470 foot (140 m) skyscraper, named Temple Tower. The project was announced on the same day as the Carew Tower. First Presbyterian hired the Midland Building Company for construction, which in turn hired local architectural firm Hannaford & Sons to design the building. Its design fused elements of Art Deco and Gothic architecture. Temple Tower was planned to be a mixed-use building, with stores on the first two floors, office space until the 32nd floor, and a new church on four floors in the rear of the building. An eight-floor "cathedral-like" spire would top the building after the 32nd office story, featuring the same golden hand from the previous church. The tower was projected to cost $2,225,000 ($41.7 million in 2025). The Great Depression began two months after the announcement of the project, and it was never built. Had it been built, Temple Tower would have been the third-tallest building in the city at the time, behind only the Carew Tower and the Fourth and Vine Tower.

First Presbyterian entered a period of financial hardship in the early 1930s. With its church building deteriorating, First Presbyterian took out a $225,000 ($5.6 million in 2025) mortgage to pay for repairs, but were still unable to afford its continued upkeep. The Hotel Burnet Co. purchased the church for $260,000 ($6.47 million in 2025) in 1933. On October 1 of that year, the congregation of First Presbyterian unanimously voted to merge with Presbyterian Church of the Covenant. The churches were subsequently joined as Covenant First Presbyterian Church at the 8th and Elm location. First Presbyterian's church was demolished in 1936 and later replaced by a branch of the Federal Reserve Bank.

== Church facility ==
The present Church building was dedicated April 11, 1875. It was designed by Cincinnati architect, William Walter. The Gothic style church was constructed, facing Piatt Park, of handcut stone from the quarries of church member Colonel Peter Rudolph Neff. The belfry remains as originally constructed and contains a huge bell bearing the old inscription in bold relief, "Revere, Boston." The unusual interior arrangement is said to have its origin in the seventeenth-century Gothic tithing -barns of the Scottish-English border country. The pulpit furniture was carved from black walnut by Henry L. Fry.

On January 29, 1973, the church's historic building was added to the National Register of Historic Places.

== List of recent pastors ==
- Rev. Frank Elder; 1928–1950
- Rev. Paul Ketchum (AP); 1940–1942
- Rev. J. Louis Crandall (AP); 1943–1944
- Rev. Hodson Young (AP); 1944–1945
- Rev. John McLeod (AP); 1945–1953
- Rev. Irvin Yeaworth; 1950–1967
- Rev. S. Allen Catalin (AP); 1957–1960
- Rev. Harold Russell; 1967–1984
- Rev. Robert Strain (AP); 1973–1974
- Rev. Peter J. Fosburg; 1984–1994
- Rev. Russell Smith; 2001–2020
- Rev. Nathaniel M. Wright (AP); 2008–2013
- Rev. Dr. Dan M. Turis; 2023-Present
