= Equestrian statue of William Henry Harrison =

Equestrian statue in Cincinnati, Ohio, U.S.

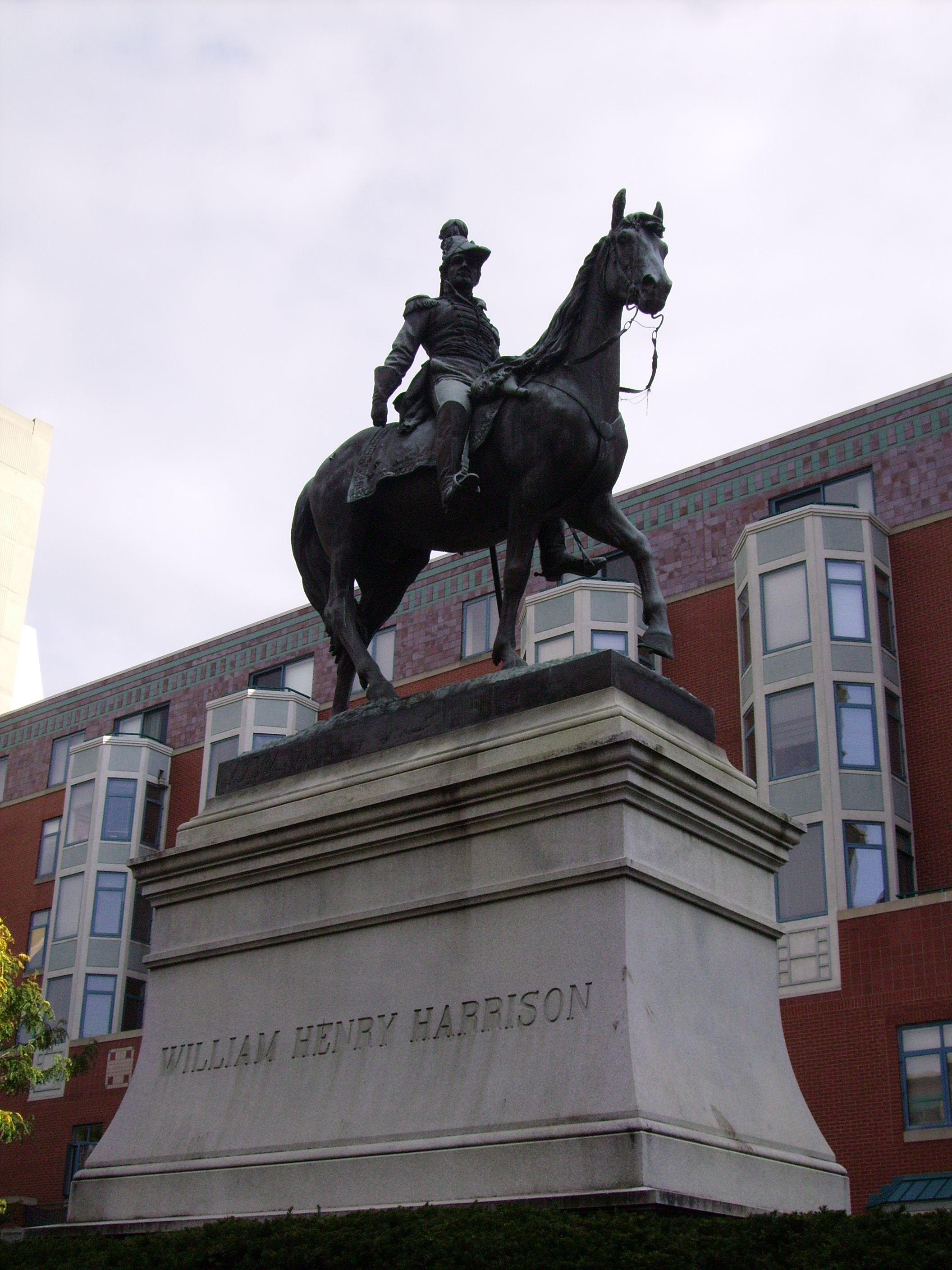
- The statue in 2006
- Interactive map of Equestrian statue of William Henry Harrison
- Location: Piatt Park, Cincinnati, Ohio, United States
- Coordinates: 39°06′14.65″N 84°31′00.58″W
- Designer: Louis Rebisso
- Builder: M. H. Mosman; Legner & Quaing (pedestal)
- Material: Bronze; Barre granite (pedestal)
- Height: 27 feet (8.2 m)
- Dedicated date: May 30, 1896
- Dedicated to: William Henry Harrison

An equestrian statue of William Henry Harrison stands in Cincinnati's Piatt Park, in the United States. The monumental statue was designed by sculptor Louis Rebisso and was unveiled on Decoration Day, 1896.

== History ==
=== Biography ===
William Henry Harrison was an American military officer and politician. Born into a planter class family in Virginia in 1773, Harrison joined the Regular Army in 1791 and participated in the Northwest Indian War. In 1798, he entered into politics, serving in various positions in the Northwest Territory and later the Indiana Territory. Following military service in the War of 1812, Harrison again returned to politics, serving in various political offices in the newly created state of Ohio. He was elected President of the United States in the 1840 election, but died shortly after his inauguration, becoming the first American president to die in office. Harrison was the first of eight American presidents from Ohio.

=== Background ===
Efforts towards erecting a monumental statue in Cincinnati in honor of Harrison began in 1886 when a commission organized a competition wherein they solicited sculptors to submit their proposals by September 10, 1887. In Winter 1886, the Ohio General Assembly appropriated $25,000 towards this project, with the statue projected to be unveiled in 1888, on the centennial anniversary of the settlement of Marietta, Ohio. By October 1887, sculptor Louis Rebisso's proposal was selected by the commission. Rebisso, a Cincinnati native, was selected over multiple other sculptors, including Moses Jacob Ezekiel of Rome. The design by Rebisso would depict Harrison as an elderly man riding on his favorite horse, making it an equestrian statue. Despite the planned dedication year of 1888, an article published in August 1891 noted that at that time, Rebisso had only completed the model of the statue, which he expected to send to a foundry for casting within the next several months. On May 21, 1892, the statue was cast at the foundry of M. H. Mosman in Chicopee, Massachusetts.

=== Dedication ===
In late 1892, the statue was dedicated in Chicago as part of Ohio's exhibition at the World's Columbian Exposition. Ohio Governor William McKinley and President Benjamin Harrison (grandson of William Henry Harrison), among others, gave speeches at the dedication. Following the Columbian Exposition, the statue was later unveiled in Piatt Park in Cincinnati on May 30, 1896 (Decoration Day). According to an article published in McClure's Magazine in January 1896, the statue had been completed years earlier, but had been kept in storage for several years "because there was not public interest enough in the matter to meet the cost of setting it up." For instance, despite the statue itself having been completed in 1892, it wasn't until 1896 that a contract for the pedestal was arranged, with Legner & Quaing of Cincinnati providing the plinth for the statue. The monument is notable for being the only equestrian statue in the city.

=== Relocation and recent controversy ===
While the statue was originally located near the park's Vine Street entrance, the statue was moved in 1988 to the Elm Street entrance to the park. This was part of a redevelopment of the park that also saw the slight relocation of the statue of James A. Garfield in the park.

In 2020, during nationwide George Floyd protests, protestors called for the removal of the statue, citing Harrison's history as a slaveholder. On June 14, 2020, Cincinnati City Council member Chris Seelbach announced that he would introduce a motion to remove the statue from the park, claiming that the monument is "pro-slavery". Two weeks after the removal was proposed, a representative from the Harrison/Symmes Memorial Foundation (which administers the William Henry Harrison Tomb State Memorial and an associated museum in North Bend, Ohio) said they would be willing to pay for the relocation of the statue to their museum in North Bend. The Cincinnati Enquirer stated that the move would have to be approved by both the city council and the Cincinnati Park Board. As of January 2021, the statue is still in Piatt Park.

== Design ==
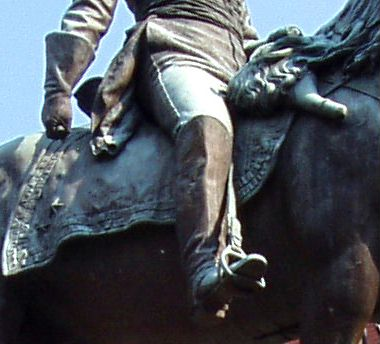
Detail of the statue, showing stirrup and no saddle

The monument consists of a bronze equestrian statue of Harrison atop a Barre granite pedestal. The bottom of the base measures 22 feet (6.7 m) by 15.5 feet (4.7 m). The phrases "Ohio's First President" and "William Henry Harrison" are engraved on opposite sides of the pedestal. The base of the statue itself covers an area of approximately 4 feet (1.2 m) by 6 feet (1.8 m). The pedestal measures 13 feet (4.0 m) tall, while the statue is 14 feet (4.3 m) tall. Harrison is depicted in his military dress, wearing a chapeau and with a sword in hand. In a biography on Harrison, author Gail Collins assumed that the horse was modeled after Whitey, a personal horse owned by Harrison that he had ridden at his inauguration. Notably, the horse is not wearing a saddle, making it unclear what is holding the stirrups in place.

In a 1912 publication on the history of Cincinnati, author Charles Frederic Goss referred to the statue as "very excellent". However, Florence Cole Quinby's 1913 book The Equestrian Monuments of the World says that "the quaint chapeau with a feather gives the work almost a comical appearance."

While originally facing east, the statue has faced west since its relocation in 1988.

== See also ==
- 1896 in art
- List of equestrian statues in the United States
- List of memorials to William Henry Harrison
- List of sculptures of presidents of the United States
