= Aggravation de l'Espace =

- Aggravation of Space (English)
- Artist: Jean Boutellis
- Year: 1980
- Type: Steel
- Dimensions: 240 cm (96 in)
- Location: Cincinnati, Ohio, United States; 39°6′23.81″N 84°31′9.64″W
- Owner: City of Cincinnati

Aggravation de l'Espace is a public artwork by French sculptor Jean Boutellis (born 1937), located on a median on Central Parkway in Cincinnati, Ohio, United States. This sculpture was surveyed in 1994 as part of the Smithsonian's Save Outdoor Sculpture! program.

== Description ==
This abstract steel sculpture has two large "leg-like" prongs on both sides of a triangular center piece. The sculpture is placed on small concrete disks which rest in a circular garden in the middle of the median along a busy street-way. The sculpture is painted red.

== Acquisition ==
Aggravation de l'Espace was donated to the city by the Robert A. Taft family. The sculpture was originally installed in front of Cincinnati City Hall but after September 1984 it was moved to its current location. According to Cincinnati Parks and Parkways the piece was moved to its new location because it "was so annoying to pedestrians."

== Information ==
Locals have been known to call the sculpture "Cootie" because the sculpture's leggy design looks like a "bug" from the game Cootie.

== Condition ==
This sculpture was surveyed by Save Outdoor Sculpture! in 1994 and was described as needing treatment. The sculpture is frequently repainted due to the frequent fading of the color. The paint is also known for flaking and rust is known to form underneath the structure. At the time of the survey it was in need of repainting.
