= Piatt Park =

Park in Cincinnati, Ohio, United States

Coordinates: 39°06′15.00″N 84°30′58.55″W

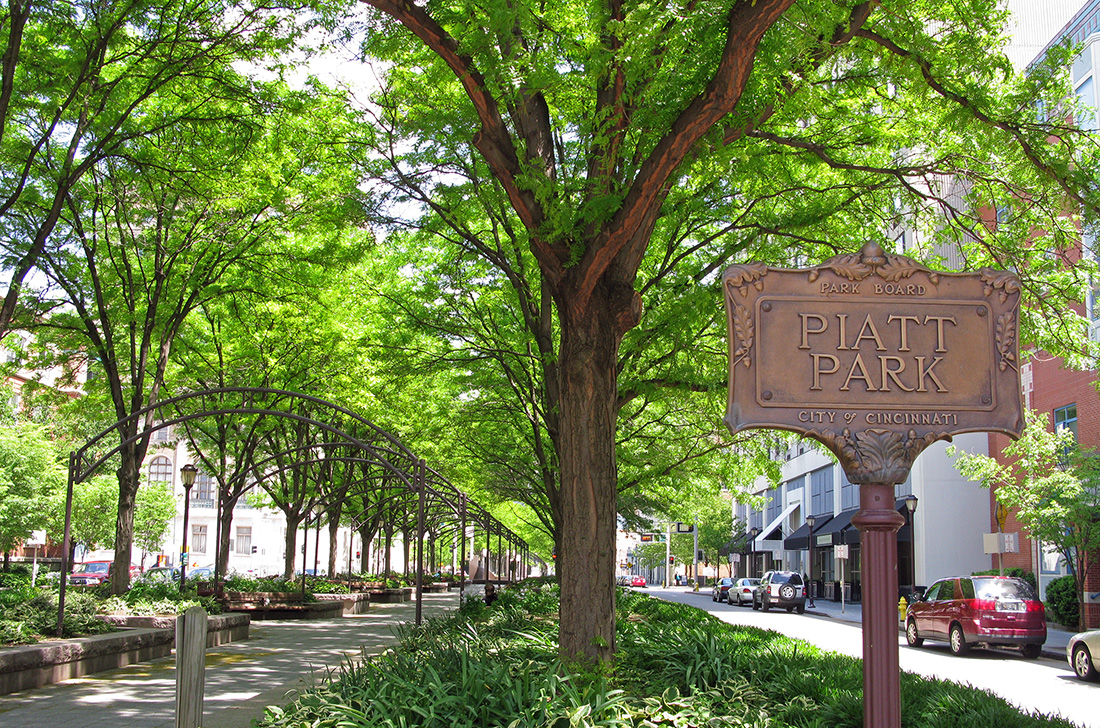
Piatt Park

Piatt Park (est. 1817) is the oldest park in Cincinnati, Ohio. The urban park stretches two blocks between Elm Street and Vine Street on Garfield Place/8th Street. The park is owned and maintained by the Cincinnati Park Board.

== History ==
In 1817 John H. Piatt, a steamboat builder, and his brother, Benjamin M. Piatt, a Federal Circuit Judge and father of Civil War general Abram S. Piatt, gave 1 acre (0.40 ha) to the city on the condition it be used "for a market space". Its close proximity to the Sixth Street Market probably prevented the carrying out of the original wishes of the donors, and on June 19, 1868, the land along Eighth Street was formally dedicated to park uses.

Bronze statues of US Presidents from Ohio stand on either end of the park, with a sculpture of James A. Garfield facing Vine and one of William Henry Harrison facing West toward the Covenant First Presbyterian Church across Elm.

The Garfield statue, by Charles Henry Niehaus, was commissioned in 1883 and unveiled in 1887. Due to the presence of the statue of Garfield, the city park was known for a time as Garfield Park, officially receiving its designation as Piatt Park by the Board of Park Commissioners in 1940. The James A. Garfield statue was originally at the center of the street crossing of Garfield Place and Race Street. In 1915 it was moved into the park close to the same intersection. It was again moved during the renovation of Piatt Park in 1988 and now stands at the Vine Street entrance to the park. In 1994 the statue was vandalized with a painted anarchy symbol which seeped into the stone pedestal and is still somewhat visible.

The bronze equestrian statue of a uniformed General Harrison on horseback by Louis T. Rebisso of the Cincinnati School of Design and his student Clement Barnhorn was dedicated in 1896. The North side of the pedestal states, "Ohio's First President" and the South side has his name "William Henry Harrison". The statue is odd in that there is no saddle on the horse, so the stirrups seem airborne. It is notable for being the only equestrian monument in Cincinnati. The monument originally faced East toward Vine Street but was moved in 1988 to its present location.

Flanking Race Street in Piatt Park are two circular reflecting pools with granite slabs that mirror the surrounding urban landscape. Beneath a curtain of water that flows over the granite surfaces are carved symbols for water, air and land. Cincinnati artist Stuart Fink’s fountain was dedicated in 1989 in memory of local delicatessen owner Isadore “Izzy” Kadetz, who died in 1983.

== Gallery ==
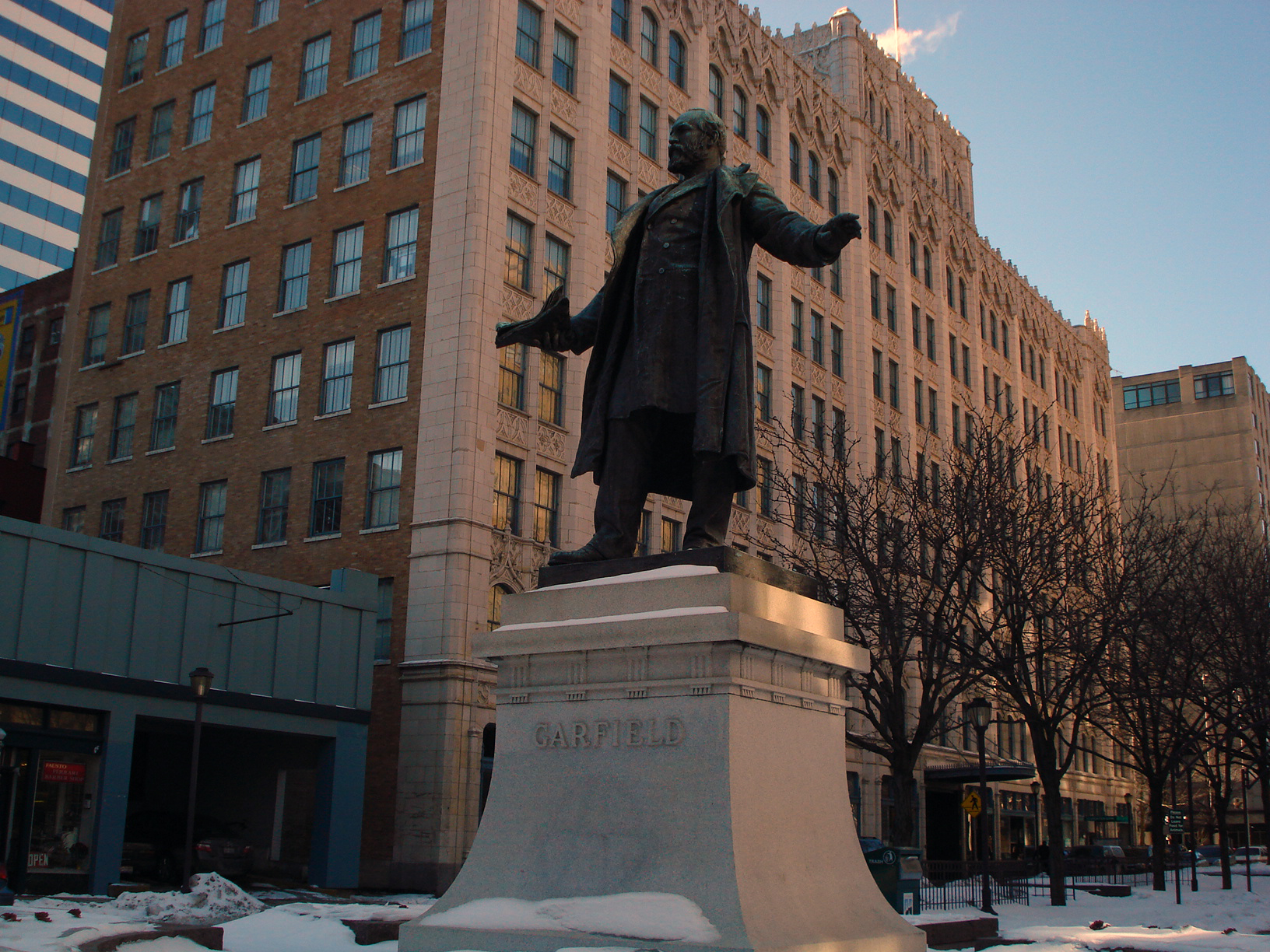
The Garfield Monument in winter.

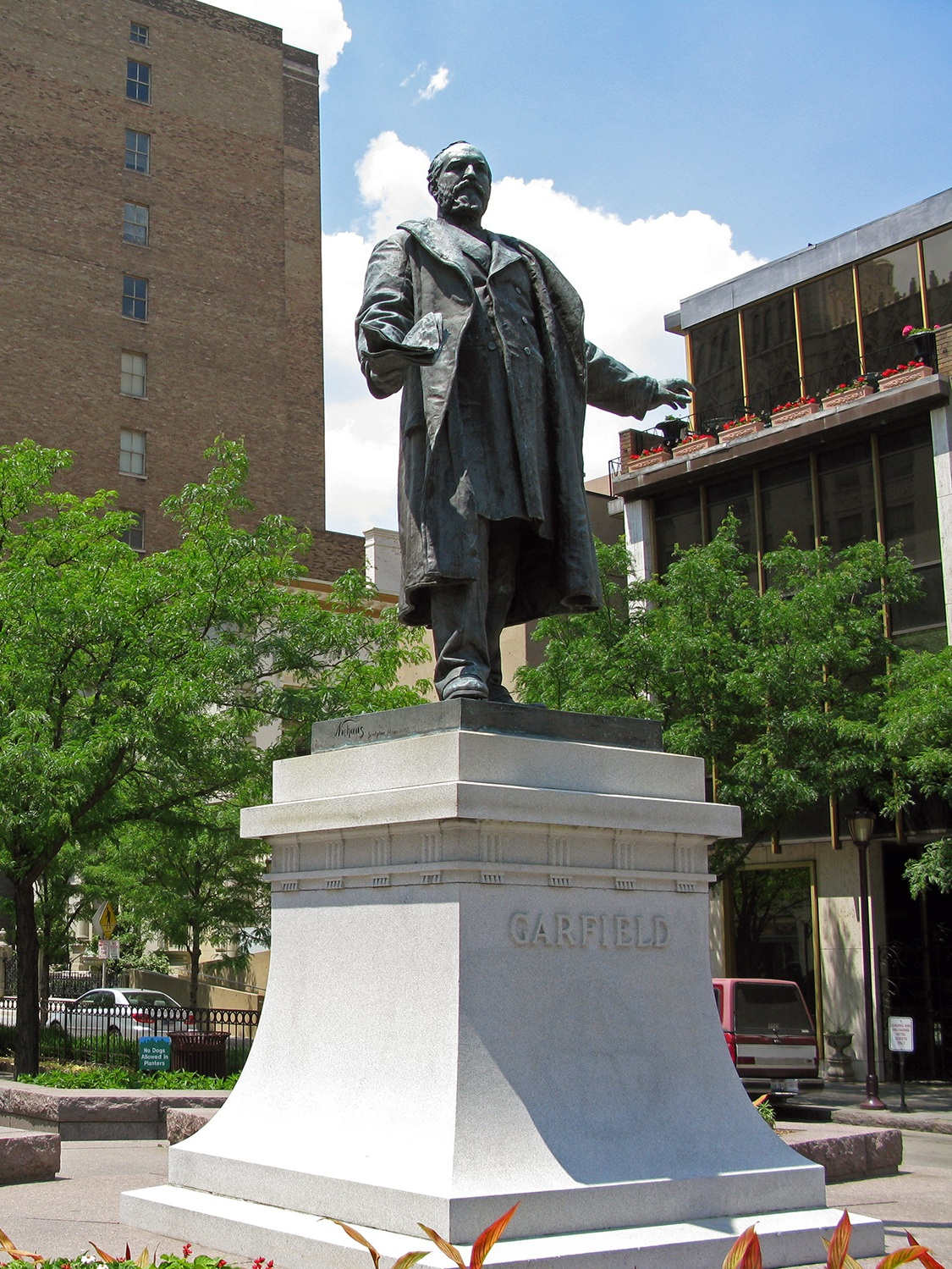
The Garfield Monument in summer.

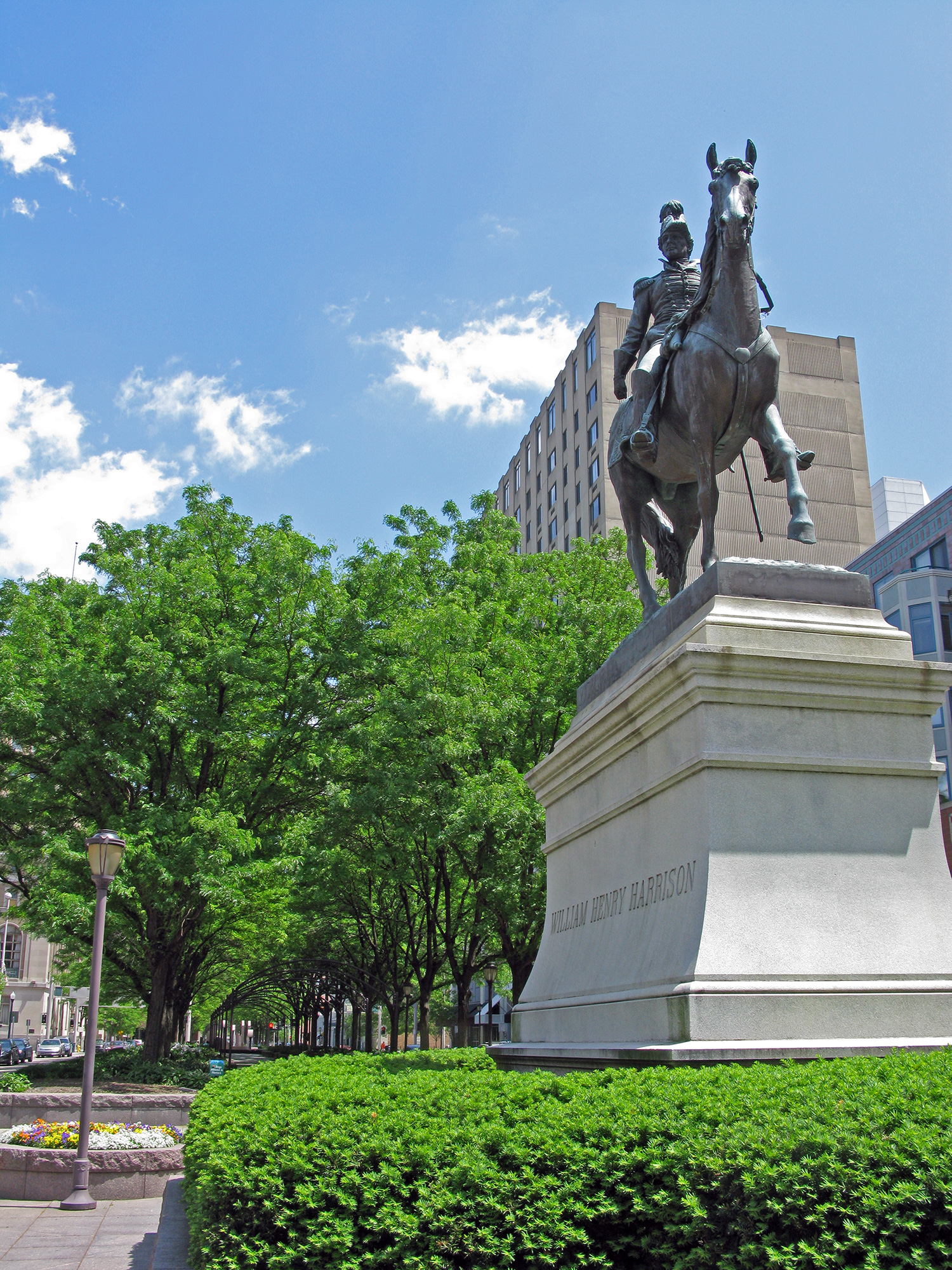
Equestrian statue of William Henry Harrison

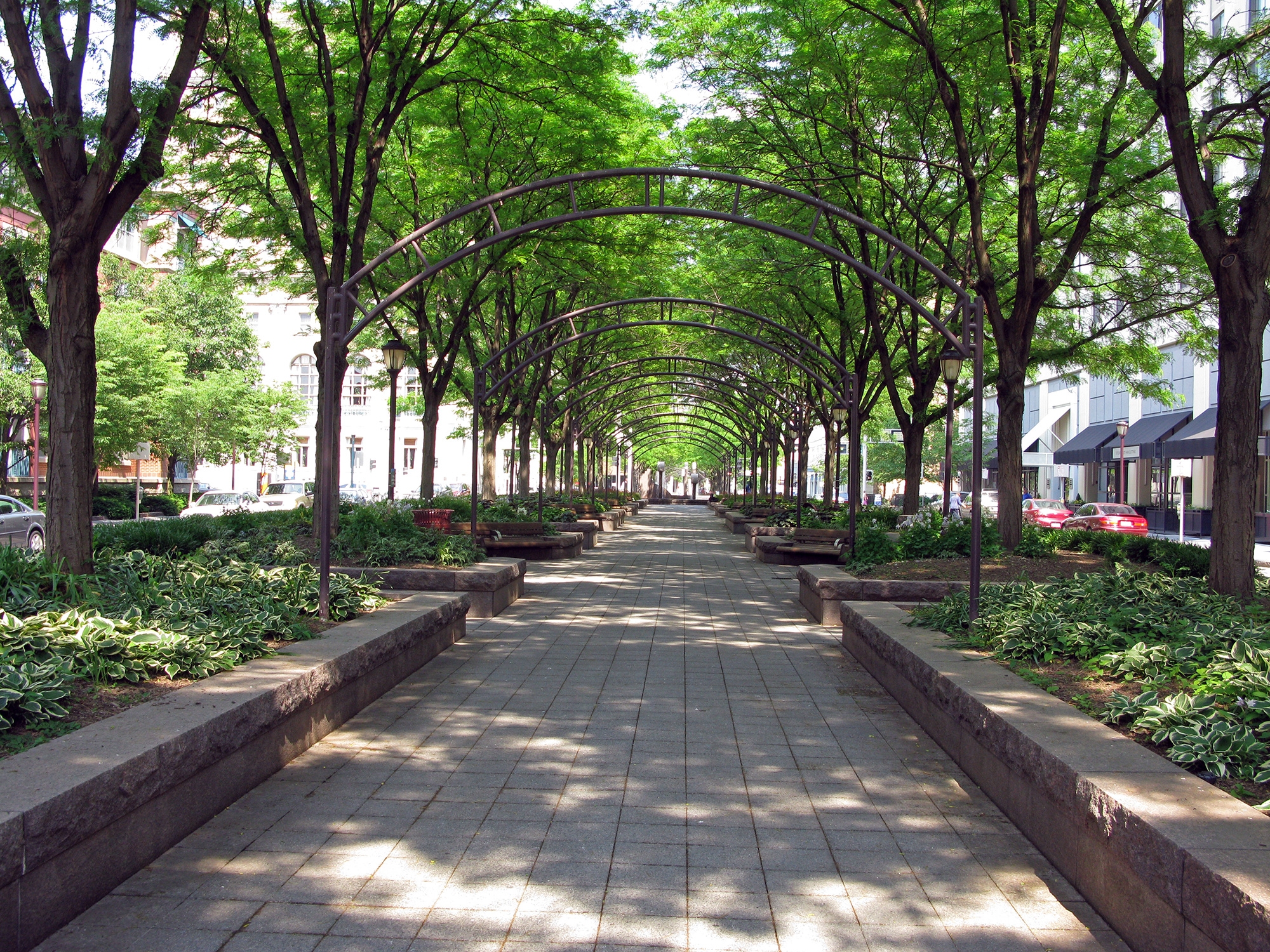
Inside the shade trees.

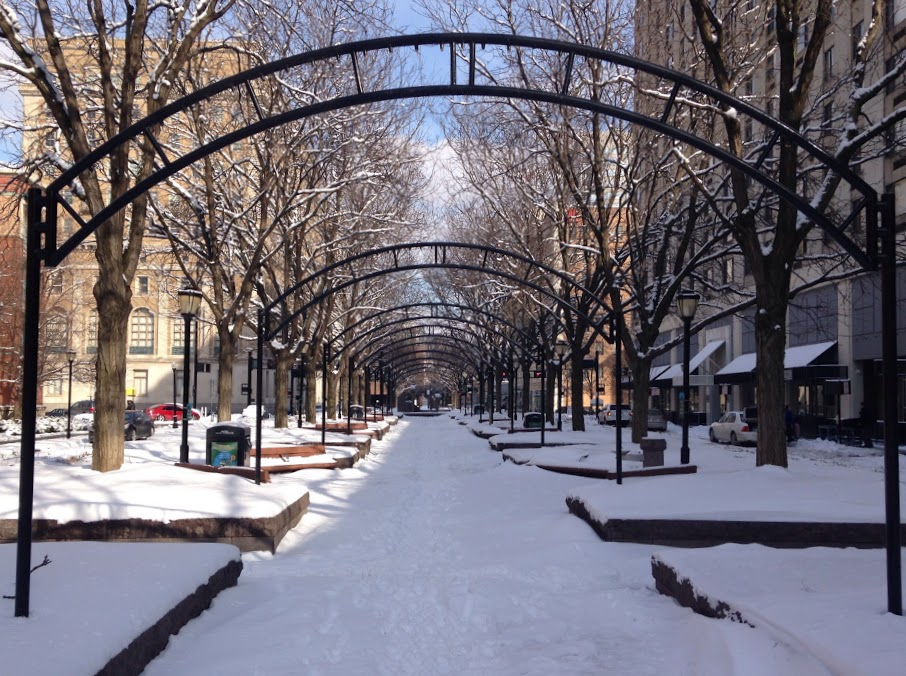
Piatt Park in Winter facing Vine.

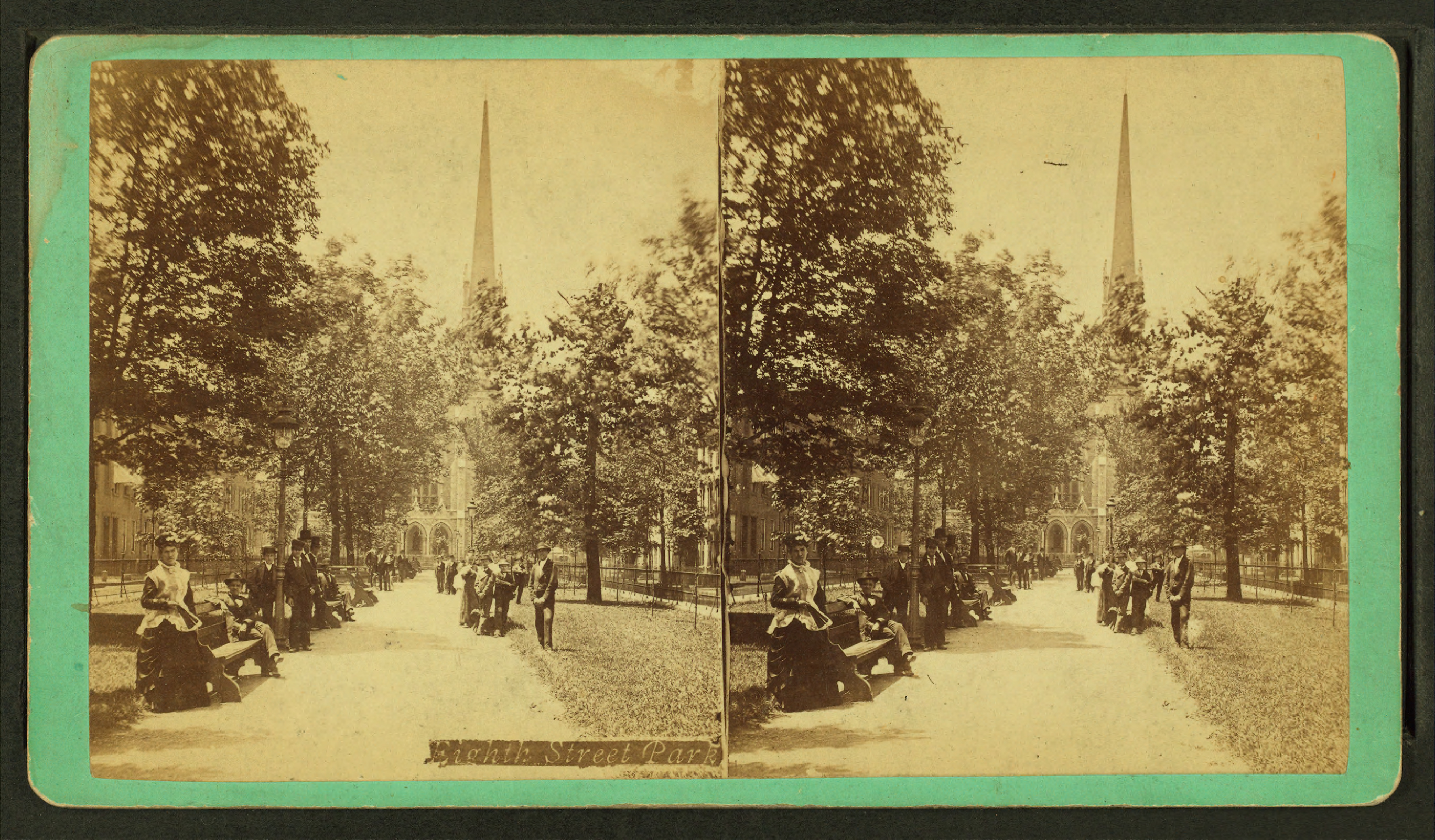
Vintage stereoscopic view of the park

== See also ==
- Lytle Park
- List of sculptures of presidents of the United States
