= Louis Rebisso =

American sculptor and teacher (1837–1899)

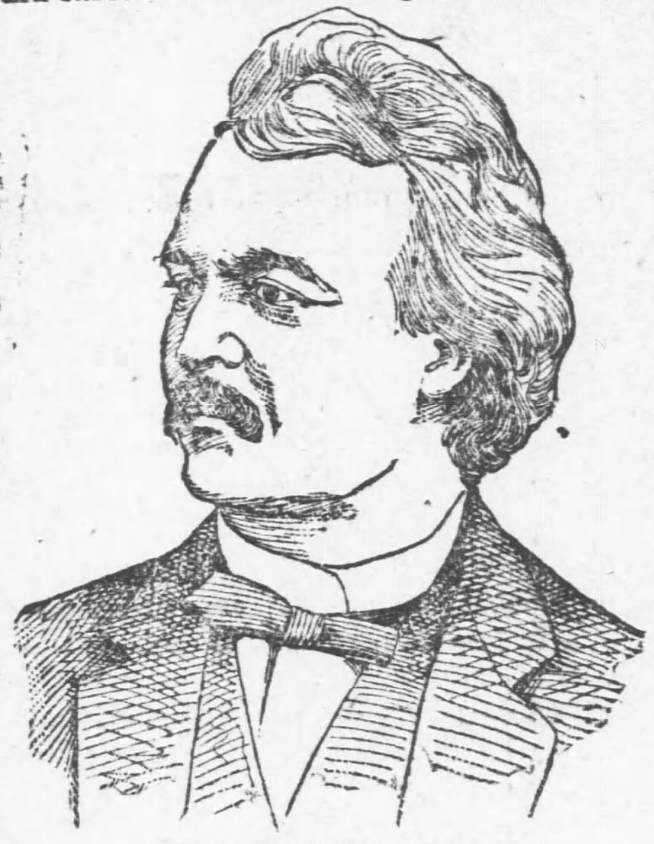
Louis Rebisso before 1891

Louis Thomas Rebisso (1837 in Italy – 3 May 1899 in Norwood, Ohio) was an Italian-born American sculptor and teacher.

== Biography ==
In Italy, Rebisso studied with the sculptor Rubalto and in an art academy under Varni. At 20, he joined in Giuseppe Mazzini's attempt to establish an Italian republic, and was obliged to leave Italy.

Taking refuge in the United States, he settled in Boston, Massachusetts, where he worked for several years in monument yards. Subsequently, he settled in Cincinnati, Ohio, where he spent the most productive years of his career, and his name as an artist developed. Rebisso sculpted the bronze statue of William Henry Harrison in Cincinnati's Piatt Park. Among those who studied with him at the Art Academy of Cincinnati were William Jacob Baer, Clement Barnhorn, Solon Borglum, Janet Scudder, Mary Chase Perry, Louise Lawson, Enid Yandell, Anna Marie Valentien, and Eli Harvey .

== Selected commissions ==
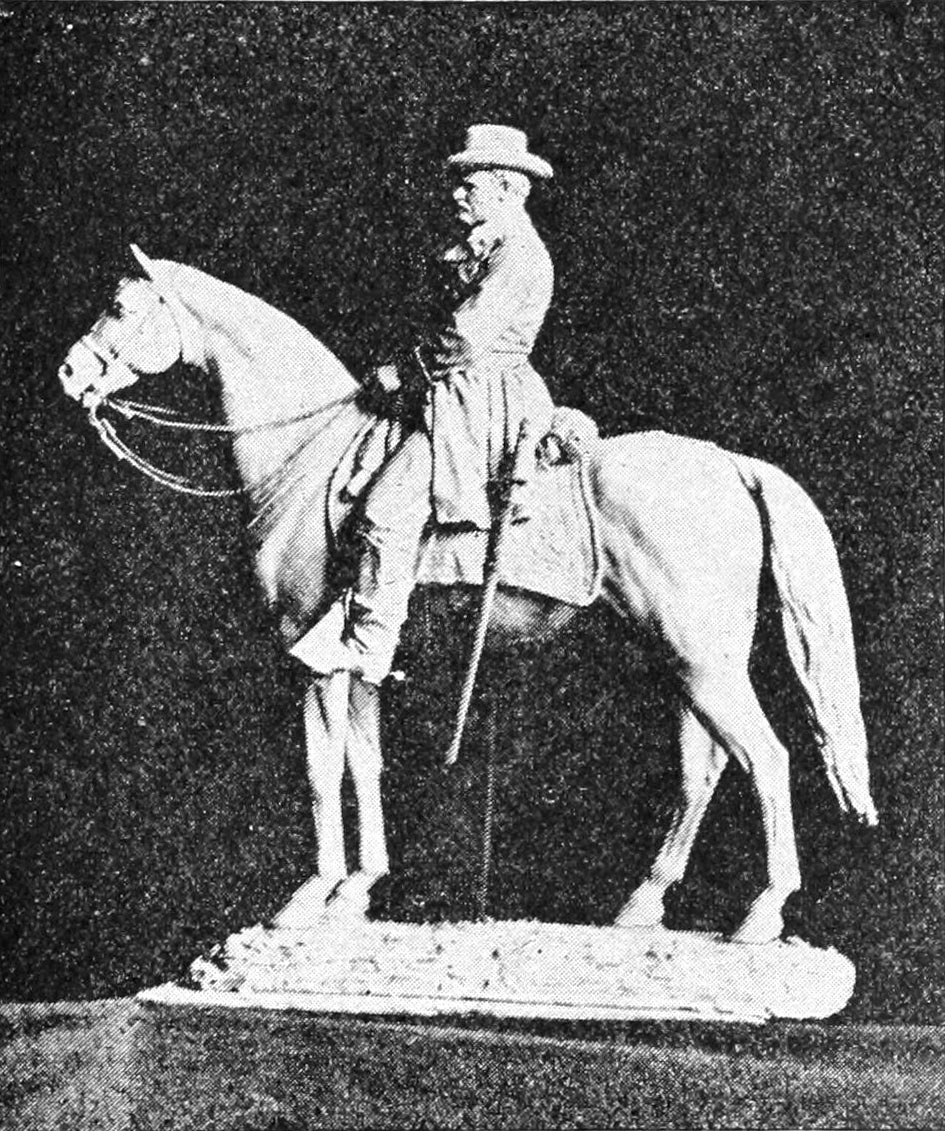
General Grant, Chicago, Illinois

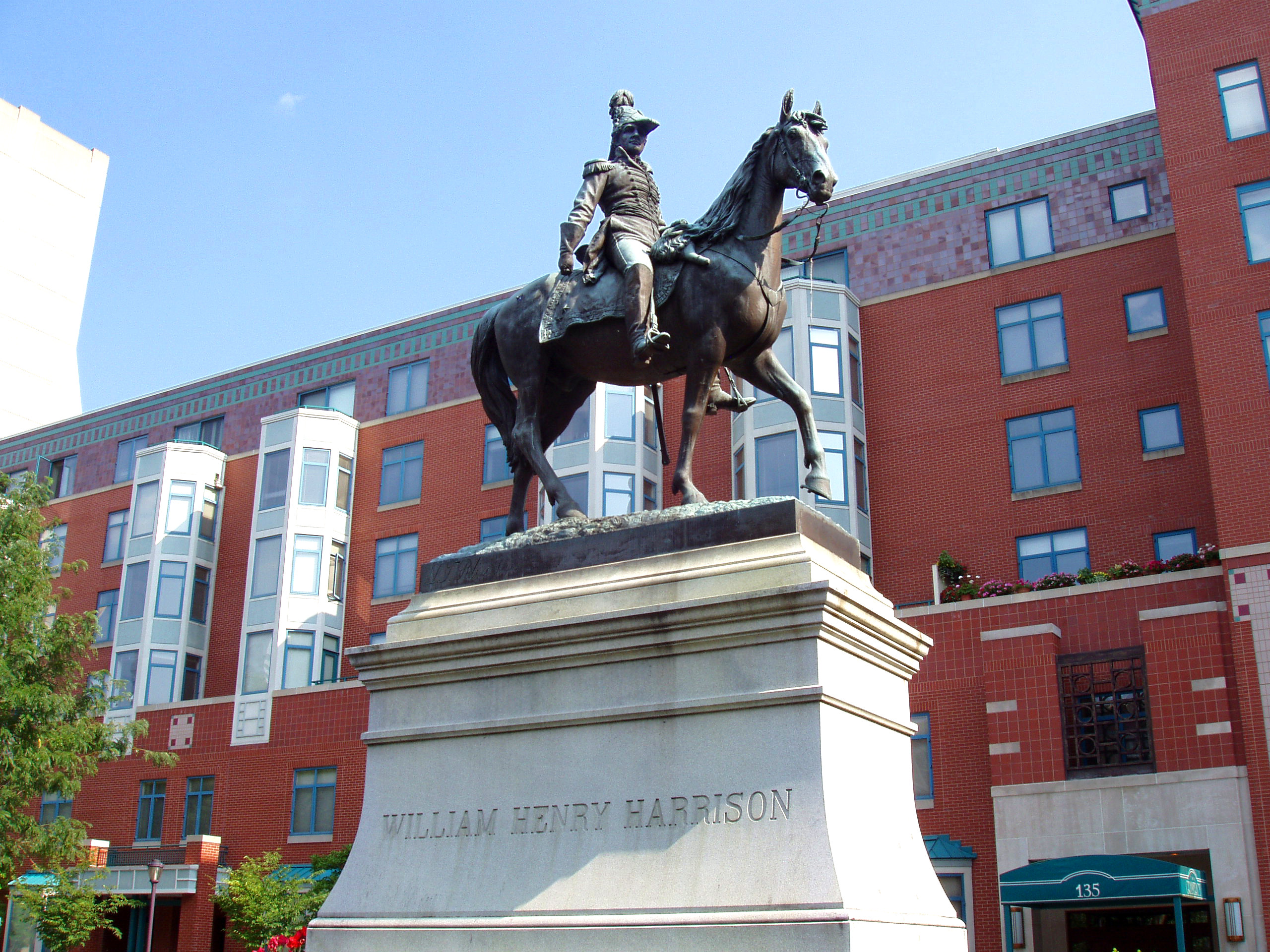
General Harrison, Cincinnati, Ohio

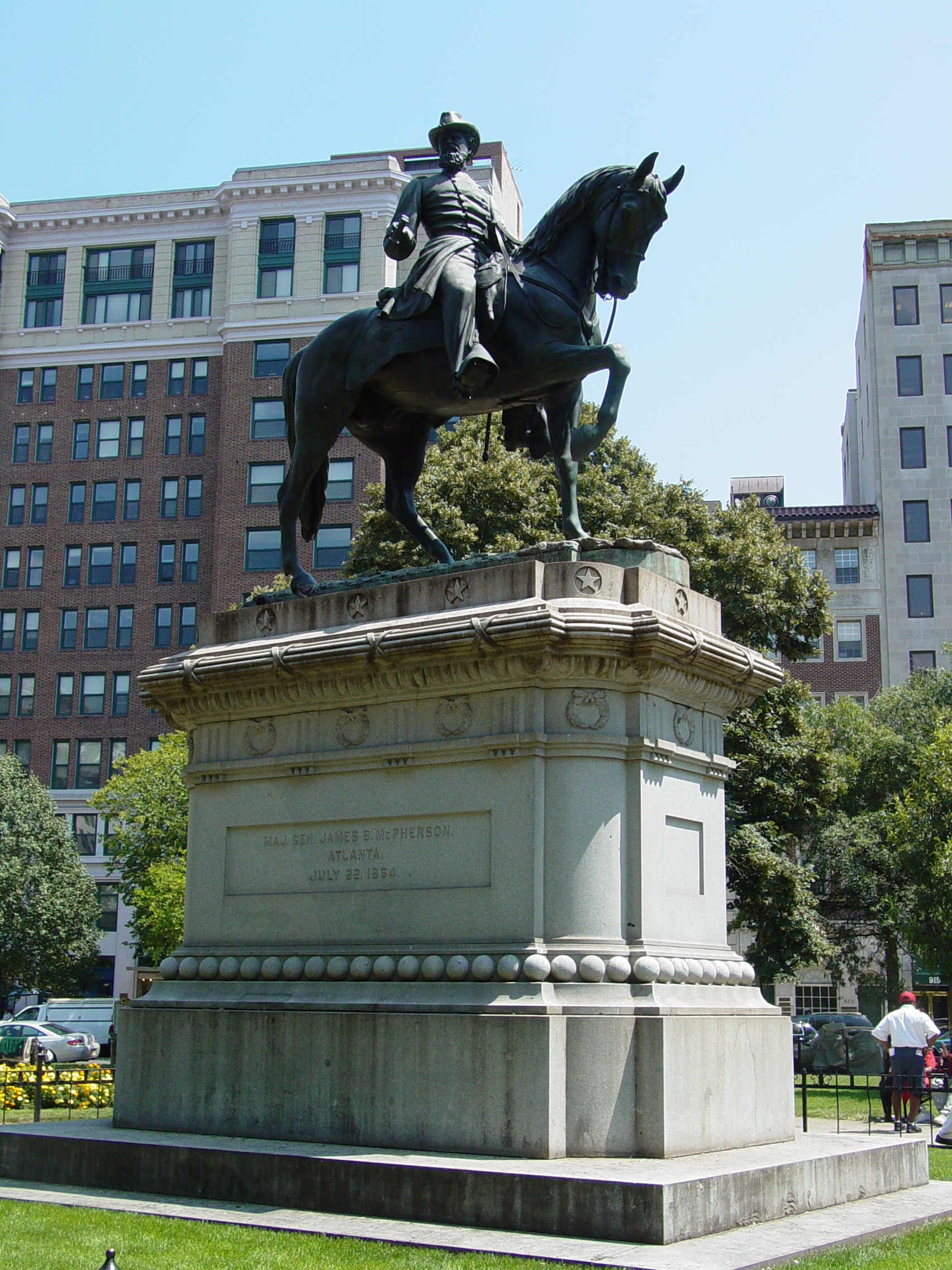
General McPherson, Washington, D.C.
