= List of summer camps =

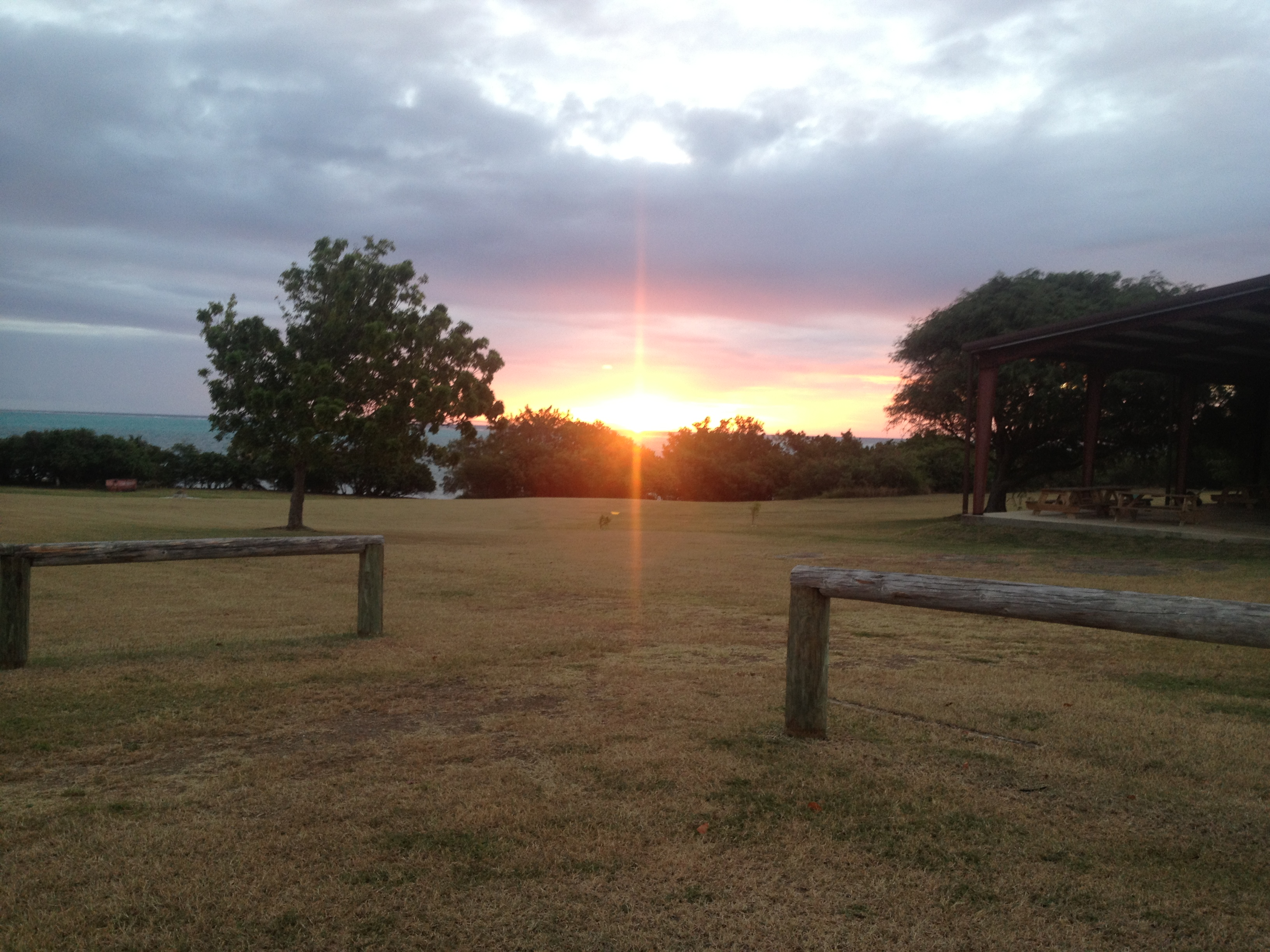
Camp Wall at sunset

This is a list of summer camps throughout the world by category. A summer camp is a supervised program for children or teenagers conducted during the summer months in some countries.

== Traditional camps ==
- Adirondack Woodcraft Camps
- Camp Agawam
- Camp Androscoggin
- Cheley Colorado Camps
- Camp Fern
- Camp Greylock
- Camp Kabeyun
- Camp Merrie-Woode
- Camp Northway
- Camp Pathfinder
- Holiday Home Camp
- Keewaydin

== Religious camps ==
=== Christian camps ===
- Camp Gray (Catholic), Wisconsin
- Camp Ondessonk (Catholic), Illinois
- Camp Unirondack (Unitarian Universalist), New York
- Christian Service Brigade (Non-Denominational), New York
- Especially for Youth (Church of Jesus Christ of Latter-day Saints), Utah
- The Wilds, (Protestant), North Carolina

== Sports camps ==
- IMG Academy
- Kutsher's Sports Academy
- Woodward Camp
- Skyhawks Sports Academy
- US Sports Camps

== Sleepaway camps ==
- Adirondack Camp
- Alpine Camp for Boys
- Brant Lake Camp
- Camp Agawam, Raymond, Maine
- Camp Beaverbrook
- Camp Canadensis
- Camp Dudley
- Camp El Tesoro
- Camp Ondessonk
- Camp Scatico
- Camp Wekeela
- Farm & Wilderness
- Forest Lake Camp
- Incarnation Camp
- Row New York

== Large network camps ==
=== Camps International ===
- Camps International (2002), an international volunteer travel operator headquartered in Ringwood, Hampshire UK and Dubai, UAE.

=== Camp Kesem ===
- Camp Kesem throughout United States.

=== Camp Quest ===
- Camp Quest (1996 in the US), an organization of 13 affiliated camps established in US, UK, Switzerland and Norway.

=== Boy Scout camps (worldwide) ===
==== Boy Scout camps (United States) ====
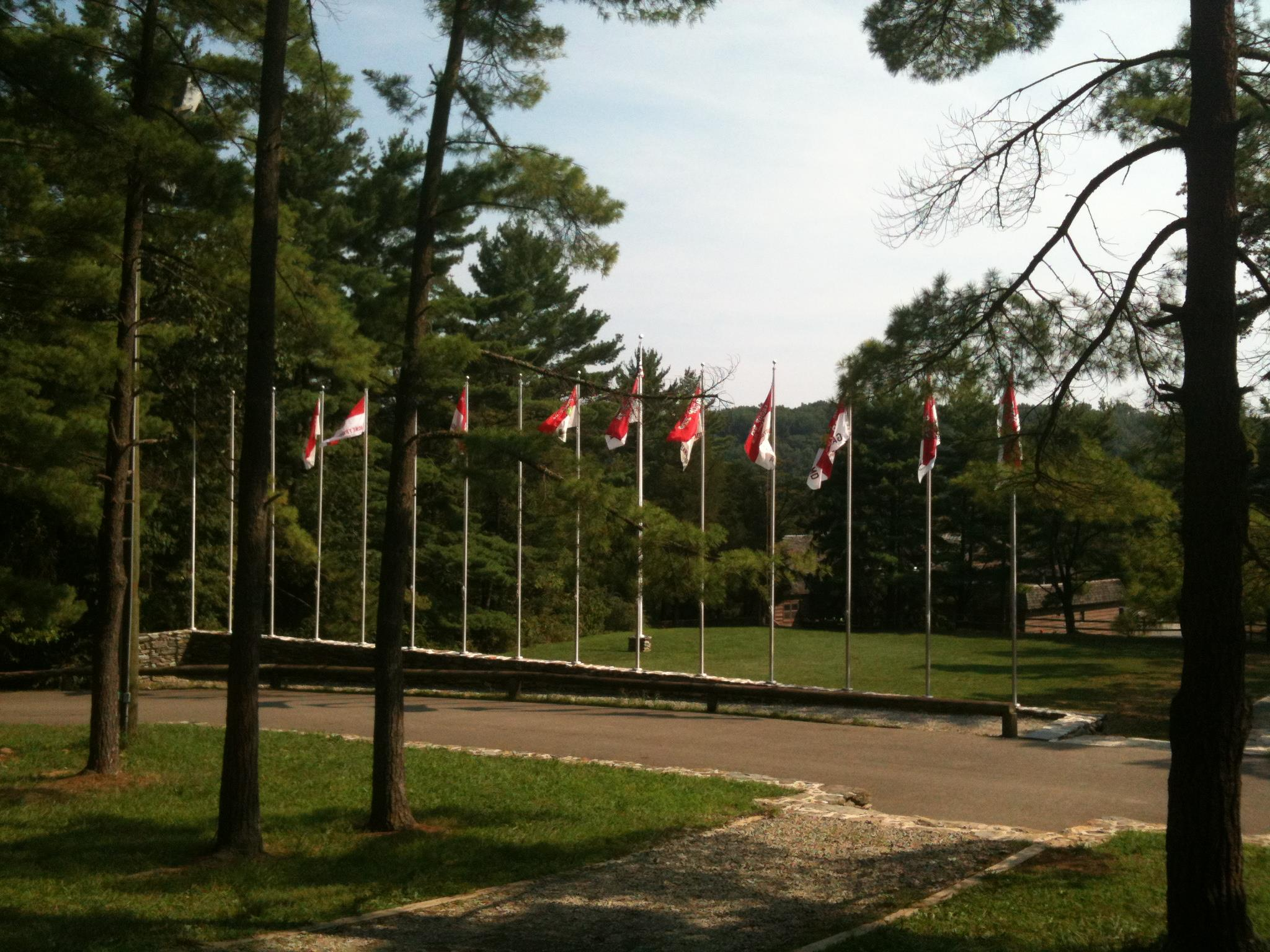
Horseshoe Scout Reservation

There are hundreds of camps hosted by the Boy Scouts of America; some of these include:

- Camp Babcock-Hovey, of the Seneca Waterways Council in the Finger Lakes Region of New York
- Camp Brulé, of the Five Rivers Council in Sullivan County, Pennsylvania
- Camp Onway, formerly of the Yankee Clipper Council in Raymond, New Hampshire
- Camp Wanocksett, of the Nashua Valley Council in Dublin, New Hampshire
- Firestone Scout Reservation, of the Los Angeles Area Council east of Diamond Bar, California
- Forest Lawn Scout Reservation, of the Los Angeles Area Council near Lake Arrowhead, California
- Goshen Scout Reservation, of the National Capital Area Council near Goshen, Virginia
- Hawk Mountain Scout Reservation, of the Hawk Mountain Council north of Strausstown, Pennsylvania
- LeFeber Northwoods Camps, of the Milwaukee County Council near Laona, Wisconsin
- June Norcross Webster Scout Reservation, of the Connecticut Rivers Council in Ashford, Connecticut
- Log Cabin Wilderness Camp, of the Los Angeles Area Council at Yosemite National Park
- Ockanickon Scout Reservation, of the Bucks County Council in Bucks County, Pennsylvania
- Owasippe Scout Reservation, of the Chicago Area Council in Twin Lake, Michigan
- Rodney Scout Reservation, of the Del-Mar-Va Council in Cecil County, Maryland
- Spanish Trail Scout Reservation, of the Gulf Coast Council in DeFuniak Springs, Florida
- Ten Mile River Scout Reservation, of the Greater New York Councils near Narrowsburg, New York
- Yawgoog Scout Reservation, of the Narragansett Council in Rockville, Rhode Island
- Winnebago Scout Reservation, of the Patriots' Path Council in Rockaway, New Jersey

==== Boys Scout camps (Canada) ====
Scouts Canada operates about 200 Scout camps across Canada.

=== YMCA/YWCA camps ===
==== YMCA/YWCA camps (Canada) ====
- Big Cove YMCA Camp, Nova Scotia, Canada
- YWCA Camp Davern, Maberly, Ontario, Canada
- YMCA Wanakita, Haliburton, Ontario, Canada

==== YMCA/YWCA camps (United States) ====
- Camp Becket, YMCA summer camp for boys, Becket, Massachusetts
- Camp Hazen YMCA, Chester, Connecticut
- Phantom Lake YMCA Camp, Mukwonago, Wisconsin
- YMCA Camp Arbutus Hayo-Went-Ha for Girls, Michigan
- YMCA Camp Cory, Milo, New York
- YMCA Camp Fitch on Lake Erie, Springfield Township, Erie County, Pennsylvania
- YMCA Camp Hayo-Went-Ha for Boys, Michigan
- YMCA Camp Jones Gulch, La Honda, California
- YMCA Camp Orkila, Orcas Island, Washington state
- YMCA Camp Seymour, Gig Harbor, Washington
- YMCA Camp Tecumseh, Lafayette, Indiana
- YWCA Camp Westwind, Oregon Coast

== Camp Fire camps ==
- Camp Namanu, Sandy, Oregon
- Camp Sealth, Vashon Island, Washington
- Camp Wyandot, Hocking Hills, Ohio

== Arts and education camps ==
- Adventures of the Mind
- Minnesota Institute for Talented Youth

=== Arts, music, and drama camps ===
- American Musical and Dramatic Academy (AMDA) High School Summer Conservatory
- Appel Farm Arts Camp, New Jersey
- Aspen Music Festival and School
- Camp Belvoir Terrace for Girls, Massachusetts
- Blue Lake Fine Arts Camp
- Bowdoin International Music Festival
- Buck's Rock Performing and Creative Arts Camp
- CAMMAC, Harrington, Quebec, Canada
- Cazadero Performing Arts Camp, California
- French Woods Festival of the Performing Arts
- Greenwood Music Camp, Massachusetts
- Harand Camp of the Theatre Arts, Wisconsin
- Interlochen Arts Camp, Interlochen, Michigan
- International Music Camp, North Dakota
- Lyceum Music Festival, American Fork, Utah
- Meadowmount School of Music, Westport, New York
- Midwest Young Artists Conservatory, Highwood, Illinois
- New England Music Camp, Sidney, Maine
- Ottawa Little Theatre Summer Drama Camps, Ottawa, Ontario, Canada
- Ottawa Little Theatre Youth Workshops
- Rocky Mountain Conservatory Theatre, Colorado (Denver), Florida and Illinois
- School of the Art Institute of Chicago, Chicago, Illinois
- Sitka Fine Arts Camp, Sitka, Alaska
- Stagedoor Manor, Loch Sheldrake, New York
- Verbier Festival, Verbier, Switzerland
- The Walden School
- YouthWrite, Bragg Creek, Alberta

=== Math and science camps ===
- Canada/USA Mathcamp, USA and Canada
- Mathematical Olympiad Program, Nebraska

==== Space camps ====
- European Space Camp, Norway
- Kennedy Space Center, Florida
- Space Camp Catalonia, Spain
- Space Camp Turkey, Turkey
- United States Space Camp, Alabama

==== Computer camps ====
- Digital Media Academy, California headquarters and camps throughout the US, plus Canada
- iD Tech Camps, California headquarters and nationwide camps (US)
- National Computer Camps, Connecticut, Georgia and Ohio
- Vision Tech Camps, California

=== Language camps ===
- Canoe Island French Camp, Canoe Island, Washington
- Concordia Language Villages, Minnesota
  - Al-Wāḥa, Arabic village, Minnesota
  - Lac du Bois French villages, Minnesota
  - Sjölunden, Swedish village, Minnesota
  - Waldsee, German village, Minnesota

== Camps focused on health, medical conditions, and special needs ==
- Barton Center for Diabetes Education (including Clara Barton Camp), Massachusetts, Connecticut, and New York
- Camp Bloomfield, California
- Camp Double H Ranch, New York
- Camp Dragonfly Forest, Pennsylvania
- Camp Wonder, California
- Happiness is Camping, New Jersey
- Hole in the Wall Gang Camp, Connecticut

== Other camps ==
=== Other camps (Canada) ===
- Camp Beaver Creek, Saskatchewan
- Des Grèves Vacation Camp, Quebec
- Camp et Auberge du Lac en Coeur, Quebec
- Camp Manitou, Ontario
- Camp Northway, Ontario
- Camp Ouareau, girl's camp, Québec
- Camp Pathfinder for Boys
- Summer Science Day Camp, British Columbia
- Camp Val Notre-Dame, Quebec
- Camp White Pine, Ontario

=== Other camps (United States) ===
- Camp Androscoggin for Boys, Maine
- Camp Anokijig, Wisconsin
- Camp Becket for Boys / Camp Chimney Corners for Girls, Massachusetts
- Camp Belknap for Boys, New Hampshire
- Camp Billings, Vermont
- Camp Bucks Rock, Connecticut
- Camp Calvin Crest, California
- Camp Canadensis, Pennsylvania
- Echo Hill Ranch, Texas
- Camp Chewonki, Maine
- Camp Firwood, Washington
- Eden Village Camp, New York
- Forest Lake Camp, New York
- Geneva Glen Camp, Colorado
- Camp Glacier View Ranch, Colorado
- Camp Gray, Wisconsin
- Camp Greylock, Massachusetts
- Camp Greystone, North Carolina
- Camp Joslin for Boys, Massachusetts
- Camp Kabeyun for Boys, New Hampshire
- Camp Keewaydin for Boys / Camp Songadeewin for Girls, Vermont
- Encampment for Citizenship, New York
- Camp Kutsher, Massachusetts
- Camp Letts, Maryland
- Camp Lohikan, Pennsylvania
- Camp Lourdes, New York
- Camp Mataponi for Girls, Maine
- Camp Merrie-Woode, North Carolina
- Camp Mo Ranch, Texas
- Camp Mountain Meadow Ranch, California
- Camp Onyahsa, New York
- Camp Quest, Virginia
- Camp Quest UK, United Kingdom
- Raquette Lake Camps, New York
- Camp Rising Sun, New York and Denmark
- Camp RiverQuest, North Carolina (page pending)
- Camp Rockmont for Boys, North Carolina
- Camp Seymour, Washington
- Camp Timanous, Maine
- Camp Unirondack, New York
- Valley Mill Camp, Maryland
- Camp Wawona, California
- Camp Wekeela, Maine
- Camp Winnarainbow, California
- Woodward Camp, Pennsylvania

== Former camps ==
- Big Doe Camp, Canada
- Camp Beaverbrook, California
- Camp Diana-Dalmaqua, New York
- Camp Ma-Ho-Ge, New York
- Camp Naomi, Massachusetts and Maine
- Camp Ranger, New York
- Camps Mohican Reena, Massachusetts
- Camp Watonka for Boys, Pennsylvania
- Kutsher's Camp Anawana, New York
