= Camp Canadensis =

Jewish camp in Pennsylvania, US

Coordinates: 41.218412°N 75.202639°W

- Camp Canadensis sign
- Interactive map of Camp Canadensis
- Location: Canadensis, Pennsylvania, U.S.
- Established: 1941
- Website: canadensis.com

Camp Canadensis is a seven-week, co-ed, overnight camp located in the Pocono Mountains region of Monroe County, Pennsylvania, US. Camp Canadensis is made up of campers primarily from New York, New Jersey, and Pennsylvania; however, there are campers coming from other nearby states. Facilities include a 75-acre (300,000 m^{2}) private lake, indoor and outdoor hockey rinks, a 2,500-square-foot (230 m^{2}) gymnastics room, indoor, and outdoor basketball courts, two heated pools, a 9,000-square-foot (840 m^{2}) art center, a high ropes adventure course, a low ropes team building circuit, a 40-foot (12 m) high rock wall, horse stables, a golf range, an all-weather outdoor amphitheater, and 12 tennis courts, 10 of which are lit for night use.

At Canadensis, their goal is "to create an environment that is emotionally, physically and socially safe for campers and their parents in a first-rate facility".

Canadensis is an American Camp Association accredited camp.

== History ==
Camp Canadensis was founded by William "Uncle Bill" Saltzman in 1941, and was named a Pioneer of Camping by the American Camp Association. He owned and operated the camp until his death in 1997; in his later years, his son Stevan co-operated the camp. After Bill's death, Stevan operated the camp until his death in 2000. Since then, Stevan's sister Terri Saltzman has owned and operated the camp.

=== Activities ===
Outdoor adventure	Water sports	Athletics	Fine arts
High ropes course	Swimming	Basketball	Art shack
Low ropes course	Waterskiing	Baseball/softball	Woodworking
40-foot (12 m) rock wall	Knee/wakeboarding	Soccer	Ceramics
COALS outdoor program	Waterslide/climbing tower	Floor/roller hockey	Photography
Mountain biking	Sailing	Tennis	Glass fusion
Honda motor bikes	Windsurfing	Gymnastics	Sewing/fashion design
Go Karts	Canoeing/kayaking	Lacrosse	Rocketry
Archery	Lake boats	Golf	Musical theatre
Horseback riding	Water trampoline	Volleyball	Dance
		Wrestling	Rock band
		Flag football	Cooking
		Weight room/aerobics	Radio
		Gaga	STEM
		Frolf	

== Recent years ==
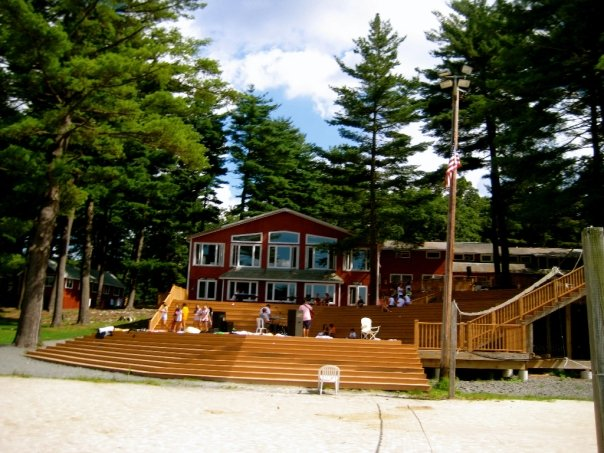

In 2000 Canadensis built a 9,000-square-foot (840 m^{2}) art center; The Sylvia Saltzman Art Center is divided into six different rooms for a variety of art programs: The Art Shack (general crafts, drawing, painting, jewelry-making, tie-dyeing, etc.); Woodworking; Ceramics; Photography (black & white, and digital); Glass Fusion; and Fashion Design.".

In 2008 Canadensis built an outdoor amphitheater. Aunt T's Amphitheater overlooks Lake Lenape and serves as the venue for the camp's morning lineup, as well as a variety of evening programming.

Other recent additions to Camp Canadensis include an indoor, all-weather, basketball court, and newly renovated horse stables.

The camp's new website was designed by Philadelphia graphic designer Andy O'Dore.

== Out-of-camp trips ==
Canadensis Senior Campers embark on four different multiple-day, out-of-camp trips to various locations. Traditionally, the trips visit the same destinations each year. Canadensis lower seniors spend 3 days and 2 nights in Lake Placid, New York, each summer. Campers visit the Olympic Training Center, and take part in a variety of Olympic Attractions. Canadensis upper seniors spend 3 days and 2 nights sightseeing in Boston. Although the exact details change every year, common attractions include a Boston duck tour, lunch at Fire and Ice, Quincy Market, and a tour of Harvard University. Super seniors spend 4 days in Niagara, and take part in traditional tourist attractions, such as Maid of the Mist. In 2010, the Niagara Falls trip also included a Cleveland, Ohio, component, so campers could experience the Rock and Roll Hall of Fame. Canadensis CITs (counselors-in-training) spend 5 days at the Walt Disney World Resort in Orlando, Florida. In 2009 Canadensis introduced an optional college tour trip for their oldest campers, visiting Penn State, Franklin and Marshall, and Lehigh University. In 2010 the trip featured a series of New York schools.

== Traditions ==
Color War has been a tradition at Camp Canadensis since its establishment in 1941. It unfolds over the course of five days, during which the entire camp community divides into two teams, engaging in spirited competition encompassing both athletic and artistic pursuits. These two teams are led by individuals holding the titles of CIT Captains, CIT Lieutenants, Counselor Captains, and CIT leaders. To attain these roles, a staff member or Counselor-in-Training must exhibit dedication and leadership qualities that extend beyond their core responsibilities during the summer.

Originally, Color War was a unified competition, but in 1966, it was restructured into two distinct events: the Athletic Competition and the Sing Competition. Historical records, as indicated by the plaques displayed in the main office, show that Color War was scored as a single event with a single victor until 1965. From 1966 to 2006, separate winners were crowned for both the Athletic and Sing Competitions. However, beginning in 2007, Color War reverted to its original format, with a single winner determined across all competitions.

Camp Canadensis also upholds other traditions, such as celebrating Independence Day with hotdogs and fireworks. Additionally, as a grand finale to the summer, all campers and staff members partake in a memorable trip to Dorney Park & Wildwater Kingdom

== Recreation unlimited ==
Before and after the 7 Week Camp Program, Camp Canadensis rents its facility to a variety of outside groups. Recent groups include The Philadelphia Folksong Society, Girl Scouts of the USA, and Running Works, Community Middle School's Outdoor Education program, and Radnor Township School District, as well as multiple Marching Bands from bordering states.
