= Camp Naomi =

Summer overnight camp in the US

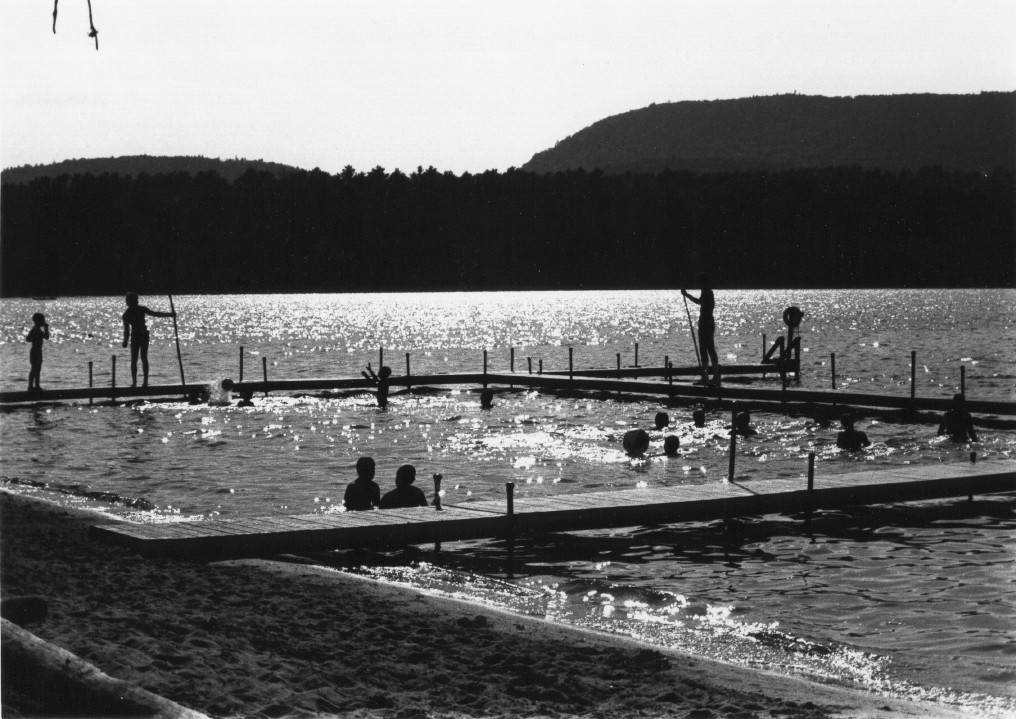
Camp Naomi Waterfront 1985

Camp Naomi was a summer overnight camp located from 1934 to 1953 in Billerica, Massachusetts, and then from 1954 to 1985 on Crescent Lake in East Raymond, Maine. The camp was operated in association with the Jewish Community Centers (JCC) of New England. Originally an all-girls camp, its brother camp Camp Joseph was closed and merged into Naomi in the mid-1970s to create a co-ed camp.

From the late 1960s until the camp closed, Leonard "Lenny" M. Katowitz served as its executive director. Katowitz died on December 11, 2005.

For campers entering their senior year of high school Camp Naomi featured a 4-week trip to Israel as part of its Counselor-in-Training (CIT) program. At the end of each summer the camp was divided into two teams, Haganah and Maccabee, for its four-day Maccabiah competition (a.k.a. color war).

On a daily basis, campers participated in activities that included sports, arts and crafts, and, on its waterfront, boating, swimming, and water-skiing.

The site formally occupied by Camp Naomi was sold and re-emerged as Camp Nashoba North in 1987.

A large reunion of Camp Naomi alumni occurred Labor Day weekend 2008 in Portland, Maine.
