= Camp Northway =

Canadian summer camp for girls

Coordinates: 45.837152°N 78.379124°W

Camp Northway, formerly Northway Lodge, is the oldest summer camp for girls in Canada, and overall Canada's fourth oldest summer camp. It was founded in 1906 and relocated to Algonquin Park, Ontario, in 1908. The camp has maintained a distinctive ethos of simple camping, crafts, and drama. Much of this is the continuing legacy of the Camp's charismatic founder, Miss Fannie L. Case.

== Setting ==
Camp Northway is situated on a peninsula on Cache Lake in Algonquin Provincial Park. The camp features a number of historic wooden structures, built by some of the first campers, and a new library and craft house. The lake setting lends itself well to canoe trips, which last from 2–8 days. The counsellor-in-training trips are longer; up to 18 days as of 2005.

== History ==
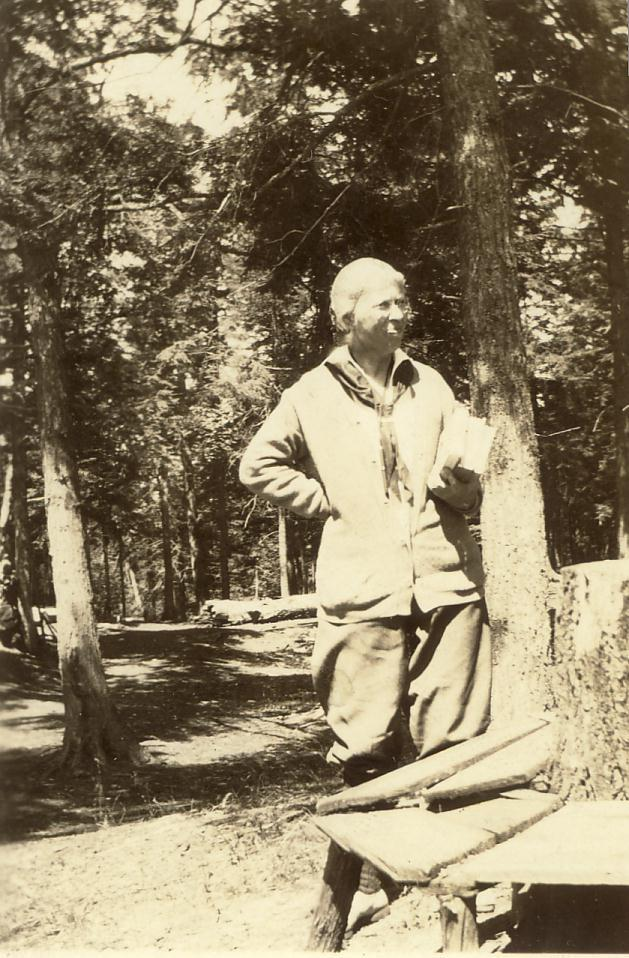
Miss Case, c. 1925

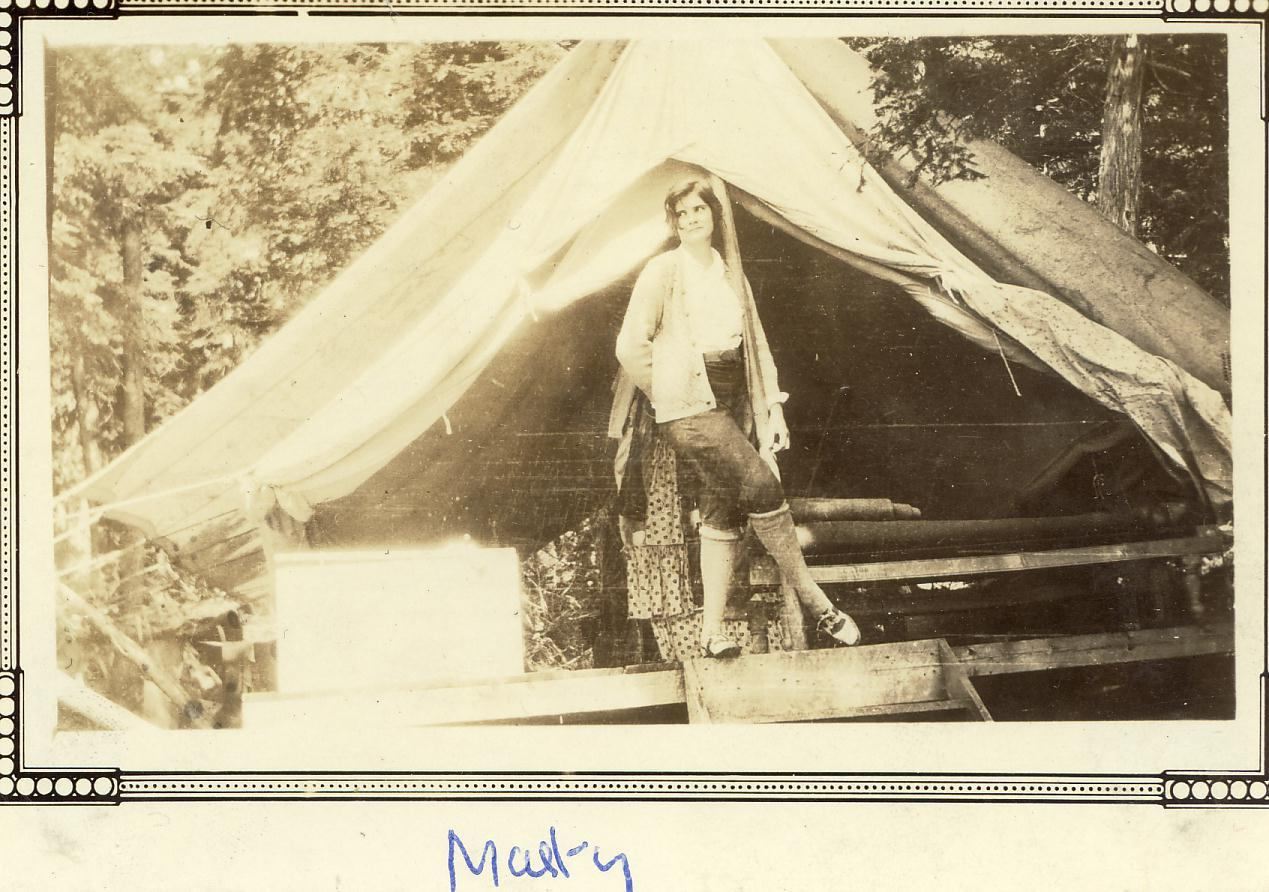
Camping, 1925

The camp came about after Fannie L. Case, a teacher, met a doctor on a camping trip. While discussing education, the idea arose of a summer camp for girls. Held in its first year at the doctor's camping ground, the camp then moved in 1908 to Algonquin Park. Case believed that life in camp should be lived in the same manner as on camping trips to better prepare for trips away. This tradition survives in that all participants live in canvas tents on wooden platforms while at the camp. Fannie L. Case believed that camp should be informal and flexible, "with no set rules, no boundaries, no whistles, bells or bugles". As well as its outdoor emphasis, Camp Northway has always had a strong element of music and drama. Something of Case's personality can be found in these words:

There should be leisure at camp, time to dream. We used to describe camp as "well spent leisure". I remember being on the lookout for writings on this subject as a justification of our effort, such as Stevenson's "Apology for an idler". Now we know that leisure is a condition of full and spontaneous living. It prepares for action later. "It is the free port of the imagination".

== Camp Northway today ==
Camp Northway is now owned by Becca and Wilson Prewitt with Camp Wendigo, a tripping outpost for boys. Described as a "wilderness camp for girls", it takes 60 campers at a time – about 150 over the course of a season, from July 1 to August 19. A family camp is run for approximately one week at the end of camp. It still has no electricity or running water, has a single wood-burning stove, and takes pride in its closeness to its rugged roots.

== Camp activities ==
A teacher specializing in psychology in Rochester, N.Y., Fannie Case believed that the ideals of canoe-tripping—friendliness, lending a helping hand, and creative adaptation in a group—was a template for life in camp and throughout adulthood. Canoe trips have remained as the focal point of life at Camp Northway. Campers embark on a canoe trip once every two weeks, in lengths varying from one night, to 15 days depending on age. Canoe trips at Northway vary in size, but typically include two staff members and four campers. Canoe trips embark at various times throughout the summer.

While in camp, campers engage in various activities, including swimming, canoeing, kayaking, sailing and nature. Campers are able to earn levels in these activities, working towards levels for the duration of their time at camp.

== See also ==
- List of summer camps
