= Camp et Auberge du Lac en Coeur =

Vacation camp in Quebec, Canada

- Location within Quebec
- Location: 50 Chemin du Lac en Coeur, Lac-aux-Sables, QC G0X 1M0, Canada
- Coordinates: 46.86200°N 72.48480°W
- Type: Vacation camp
- Season: 4 seasons
- Operated by: Les Villages Étudiants inc (non-profit organism)
- Owner: Les Villages Étudiants inc
- Established: 1946
- Website: www.camplacencoeur.qc.ca

The Camp et Auberge du Lac en Coeur (English: Lac en Coeur camp and inn) is a vacation camp established in 1946 on the south shore of Lac en Cœur in the Hervey-Jonction of the municipality of Lac-aux-Sables, in the Mékinac Regional County Municipality (MRC), in the administrative region of Mauricie, in the province of Quebec, in Canada.

The Lac en Coeur camp is a recreational center for young people offering nature classes and family activities over four seasons. During the school calendar, nature classes annually welcome nearly 3000 students from some fifty Quebec schools in various regions of Quebec. The activities are supervised by a team of camp leaders or by supervisors of children's groups. In addition, thousands of visitors (or family groups) per year use the cabins and/or the inn.

The camp secretariat is located in the village of Hervey-Jonction, at 50, chemin du Lac-en-Coeur, Lac-aux-Sables, G0X 1M0. While the head office of "Les Villages Étudiants inc." is located at Séminaire Saint-Joseph, 858 rue Laviolette, Trois-Rivières, G9A 5J1.

The "Fondation des Oeuvres du Lac en Cœur", which was established in 1990, is a charitable organization whose mission is to help families and children living in financial difficulties. In addition, this foundation helps meet the financial needs of the Lac en Coeur camp in order to ensure the sustainability of its mission. Year after year, this foundation offers outdoor stays to children and families, while seeing to their integral development and fulfillment, all at low cost.

== Buildings and infrastructures ==
Originally, military barracks from World War II, coming from the barracks on the grounds of the 1938 exhibition in Trois-Rivières, had been dismantled by volunteers and reassembled at Lac en Coeur, to serve as chalets.

== Activities offered ==
During the school calendar, camp activities are aimed at young people of all ages, especially those in daycare services, or attending elementary and secondary schools. The camp program is focused on the development of the child through activities complementary to his pedagogical training of schools, in particular group life and knowledge of nature.

Stays are offered on 1-day outdoor, 2-day and 3-day programs. This program includes nature classes: red (end of August to mid-October), white (in winter) and green (end of April until the end of the school calendar).

Depending on the season and the temperature, the possible activities for nature classes include:

- Spring and fall: hebertism trail, trampoline, climbing, canoe, bicycle, rabaska, archery, ecological center, ecological trail, kinball/parachute, Olympics, campfires, large thematic games, cooperative games, crafts, etc.
- Winter: various outdoor activities are added for children in snowsuits, in particular: sliding on inner tubes, boot hockey, ringette, snowshoeing, construction of Quinzy, snow sculpture, torchlight ride, kinball on snow, soccer on snow, winter Olympics, campfires, big thematic games, cooperative games, crafts, Native American bread tasting, etc.

Certain activities are organized on request, depending on the temperature and the seasons, in particular: workshops on nature (insects, Quebec flora and fauna), workshops on astronomy and observations, scientific workshops, clay hole (mud), evening of expression (mini play), night play, etc. Children can also discover the “legend of Lac en Cœur” and sing the camp theme song.

This vacation camp has always organized special activities (educational and sports) for the annual school break week which historically takes place in late February or early March.

== Monitors ==
Each spring, the management of the Lac en Cœur camp proceeds to recruit its volunteer monitors for teenagers in secondary 3, 4 and 5, who generally come from the Paul le Jeune comprehensive school in Saint-Tite and of the Séminaire Saint-Joseph de Trois-Rivières. These monitors act as group leaders of campers; they participate in an annual pre-camp of one week generally in May or June.

== Musical album ==
The second musical album entitled "Choeur de campeur" (Camper Choir) was launched in French in 2015 thanks to the involvement of volunteers (9 musicians, 28 singers, including former camp leaders) who carried out this project over a year. The musical direction was directed by Grégoire Brière. The main contributors were Kavin Thiffault (piano accompaniment), Martin Dugré and the Acolyte Communication team (making the album cover). This album immerses itself in the world of holiday camps with an instrumental and rhythmic touch. The 14 French songs on the album are:

- Chanson du Lac en Coeur (Song of Lac en Coeur)
- Histoire de mensonges (Story made of lies)
- Anatole et Manda (Anatole and Manda)
- Hey Ti-gars (Hey little guy)
- Si tu vas au ciel (If you go to heaven)
- Ma grand-mère était dans l'armée (My grandmother was in the army)
- Les Robes (Dresses)
- Allongeons la jambe (Let us extend the leg)
- Oh Ursula!
- Un pied mariton (A club foot)
- Les aventuriers (The adventurers)
- Le curé de Saint-Louis (The parish priest of Saint-Louis)
- Feu, feu, joli feu (Fire, fire, pretty fire)
- La voile (Sailing)

== History of the camp ==
The Lac en Cœur camp, in the "Boys-Town" style, was created in June 1946 under the aegis of the Catholic Student Youth (J.E.C.). It was created after about 18 months of process, on the initiative of Father Paul Boivin (science professor at the "Séminaire Saint-Joseph de Trois-Rivières"), with the support of his colleague Father Charles-Henri Lapointe, diocesan chaplain of the JEC, and of the Abbé Gérard Saint-Pierre who greatly contributed to the realization of the project.

The two main founders were Father Paul Boivin and Napoléon Veillette (1876-1959) of Hervey-Jonction; the latter, a man of all trades, worked there for 12 years. He contributed to the design of the general plan of the camp, as well as to the construction of the first buildings. In particular, he supervised the construction works of the current chapel which was erected in 1949–50 on an elevation.

The first director general of the camp was Father Paul Boivin who later became parish priest of Saint-Jean-des-Piles. The second founding member was Father Charles-Henri Lapointe. Originally, this holiday camp included religious training for young people. Father Grégoire Tessier acted as chaplain in 1948. In 1990, Jean Hamel worked as director of the camp (he had started as an animator in 1971); his main collaborators were then André de Lafontaine (responsible for the animation of the green classes) and Nicholas Trépanier (first instructor in 1986, then appointed "grand chef" in 1986).

This vacation colony was established on the current site which was then on loan from Consolidated Bathurst for a period of 30 years. While the Wayagamack, which owns the forest reserve, granted a lease on the sole condition that the Lac en Coeur camp offers a reforestation practice course. A mechanical ram from the Provincial Highways cleared and leveled the yard.

The three great eras of its history are:

- the episode of the Catholic Student Youth (J.E.C.) from 1946 to 1968,
- the Landry Center episode from 1968 to 1974 and
- the camp from 1974 to the present day.

This camp is currently administered by "Les Villages Étudiants inc", a registered non-profit organization that was initially registered on December 10, 1946. According to the Quebec enterprise register, this organization was re-registered on March 28. 1995, according to the Companies Act.

== Important events in the history of the camp ==
The significant events in the history of this holiday camp are:

- 1946 - Clearing and construction of six chalets for young people and one for the caretaker, as well as construction of the kitchen building. The first work team was made up of Émile and Georges Côté, Henri and Rosaire Lamarre, under the direction of Napoléon Veillette.
- 1949 (June 29) - First visit of the bishop (Mgr Georges-Léon Pelletier) of the diocese of Trois-Rivières.
- 1949-1950 - Construction of the current chapel.
- 1968 - Beginning of the joint animation of the camp by the JEC and the JECF (Jeunesse étudiante catholique féminine) (English: Young Catholic Female Student).
- 1980-1982 - Renovation work on several buildings and facilities, in particular the repair of the electrical network, the installation of septic tanks, toilets, ventilation shafts, as well as the construction of a multipurpose building serving as a kitchen and cafeteria. These renovations of approximately $250,000 follow a fundraising campaign.
- 1981 - Celebration of the 35th anniversary of the founding of the camp through various activities and reunions. The camp could then accommodate 50 boys and 50 girls at a time; or about 1200 young people per summer. In 1985, 1761 young people stayed there because of the increase in accommodation capacity.
- 1986 - Celebration of the 40th anniversary.
- 1988 - The youth-family hostel opened in mid-August (costing $620,000) following a fundraising campaign. The inn was officially inaugurated on October 2, 1988 by Governor General Jeanne Sauvé.
- 1990 - Beginning of the “green class” activity program.
- 2007 - Addition of the “Prospect'Air” camp, more focused on nature and the environment. It is a tent installed on a wooden platform, which can accommodate 12 people to sleep there. Bunk beds are installed there.
- 2016 - Celebration of the 70th anniversary.
- 2020 - Cancellation of activities since March 2020, due to the global Coronavirus COVID-19 pandemic. However, a day camp for kindergarten and elementary school children was organized during the summer of 2020, with the collaboration of the municipality of Lac-aux-Sables, the Mékinac Regional County Municipality (MRC) and the camp Val Notre-Dame.

== Toponymy ==
This vacation camp is located on the shores of Lac en Cœur, hence its name. The toponym "camp du Lac en Cœur" or "Camp et Auberge du Lac en Cœur" have not yet been formalized by the Commission de toponymie du Québec. The toponym “Lac en Coeur” turns out to be metaphorical. The heart lake takes its name from its shape which resembles a heart with the dominant right half.

The toponym “lac en Cœur” was made official on June 14, 1976 at the Place Names Bank of the Commission de toponymie du Québec.

== Appendices ==
=== Bibliography ===
- Official site of the "Camp and Auberge du Lac en Cœur"
- Press review of the history of the camp and the Auberge du Lac en Coeur, compiled in 2020 by the historian Gaétan Veillette.

=== Related Articles ===
- Lac-aux-Sables, a municipality
- Lac en Cœur, a body of water
- List of summer camps
