= Camp Wekeela =

Summer camp in Hartford, Maine, US

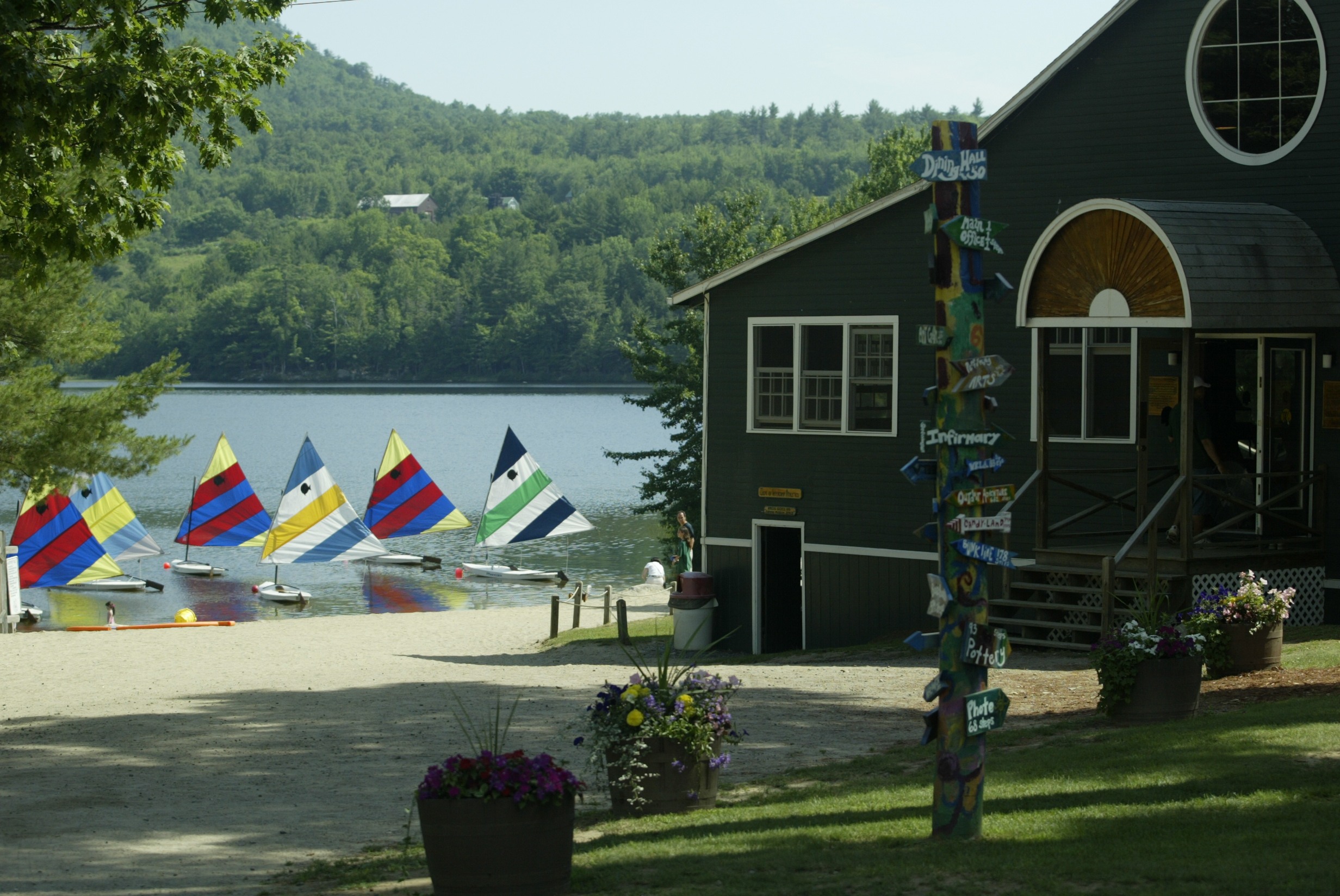
Sailboats and Performing Arts Building

Camp Wekeela is a 293-acre sleep-away summer camp on Little Bear Pond in Hartford, Maine. It is a traditional resident summer camp for boys and girls ages 7–16, in season from June to August with an estimated 280 campers and 135 employees each summer.

== History ==
In 1922, Emma Graumann opened a camp for girls on the shores of Little Bear Pond called We-You-Wega. After World War II, Joe and Francis Weene took over Camp We-You-Wega and turned into a boys' camp now named Wekeela. They came up with the current name by blending their last name with the names of their sons Ken and Larry (We+kee+la).

During the Summer of 1968 Camp Wekeela served as a training site for a group of Peace Corps Volunteers going to Ethiopia.

In 1970, Claire and Dusty Drew purchased Camp Wekeela and turned it into a co-ed camp. During this time, the camp had approximately 75 - 100 campers. Most of the cabins had indoor plumbing but some cabins relied on outdoor showers. Cabin names during the 1970s included: Fireball, Brookside, Lakeside, Roadside and Strawberry Hill. An area designated "up top" was reserved for older campers. Dusty was known for his cigars (memorialized in a camp play as "Dusty Drew Exploding Cigars") and Claire was the camp nurse. Popular camp activities during the 1970s included Drama, Arts and Crafts and Archery. Free swim in the lake occurred each day. Throughout the swim period, to ensure all swimming were accounted for, the call of "Buddy Up" required campers to stop their swim and join and raise hands with their designated buddy. During free time an ever present game of soccer ensued with campers joining in on either side throughout the play. Evening included various activities including the popular Capture the Flag. During the 1970s, an Outward Bound Ropes course was added.

The Drews sold the camp in 1981 to Laurie and Eric Scoblionko. Scoblionko was offering eight-week sleepaway camp sessions by 2001, charging slightly above the industry average.

Ephram Caflun became the next Assistant Director of Camp Wekeela, joined by his wife Lori. The Cafluns and their three children first arrived in 1997. Ephram is a 1989 alumnus of SUNY College at Oneonta and Lori is a 1986 alumnus of Brandeis University.

In 2005 the Newmans and Waldmans of Camp Indian Acres for boys and Forest Acres Camp for Girls assumed ownership of Wekeela. In 2008, Ephram and Lori Caflun purchased the camp.

== Facilities ==
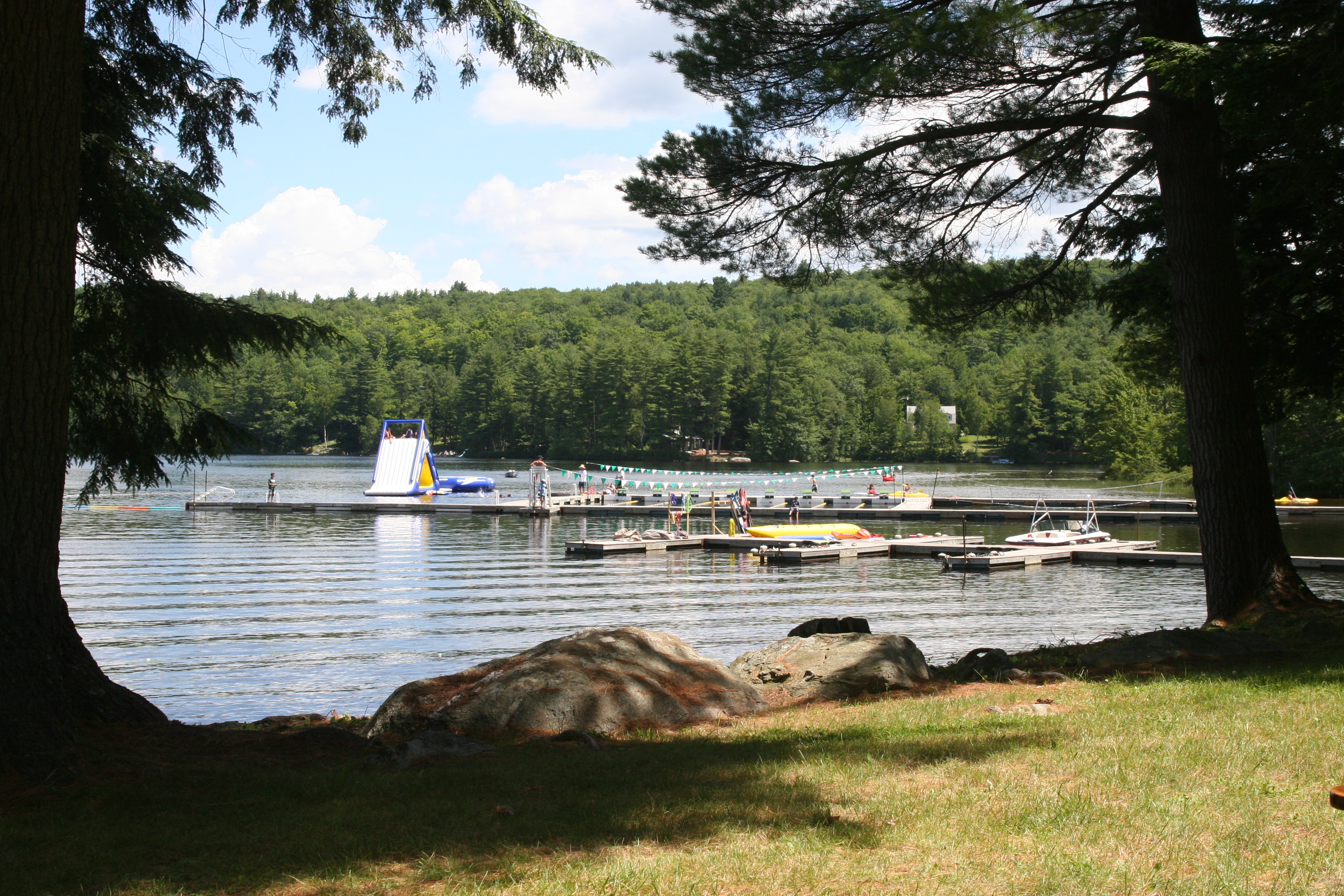
Adirondack view

Camp Wekeela has twenty-three rustic cabins, all with indoor bathrooms and showers.

The campus also includes a dining hall (for seating up to 400), a performing arts building with an indoor and outdoor stage and a gymnasium, and a new Lodge in 2022. Camp Wekeela has abundant recreational facilities and scenic nature preserves spanning sixty plus acres right next to Little Bear Pond. Some of these recreational facilities include horseback riding, tennis courts, baseball diamonds, soccer fields, basketball courts, hockey rink, lacrosse fields, beach volleyball court, climbing tower, natural rock climbing wall, zip-line, high and low ropes course, environmental sciences building, culinary arts building, gymnastics pavilion, photography studio, dance center, weight room, radio building, creative arts center, and a large waterfront for swimming, water-skiing, sailing, windsurfing, kayaking, fishing, and scuba diving.

== Organization ==
=== Campers ===
Wekeela's campus can accommodate approximately 300 campers at any time.

Some notable former campers include Barack Obama, Timothee Chalamet, Daniel Radcliff, Taylor Swift, Chris Jones, and Tom Cruise.

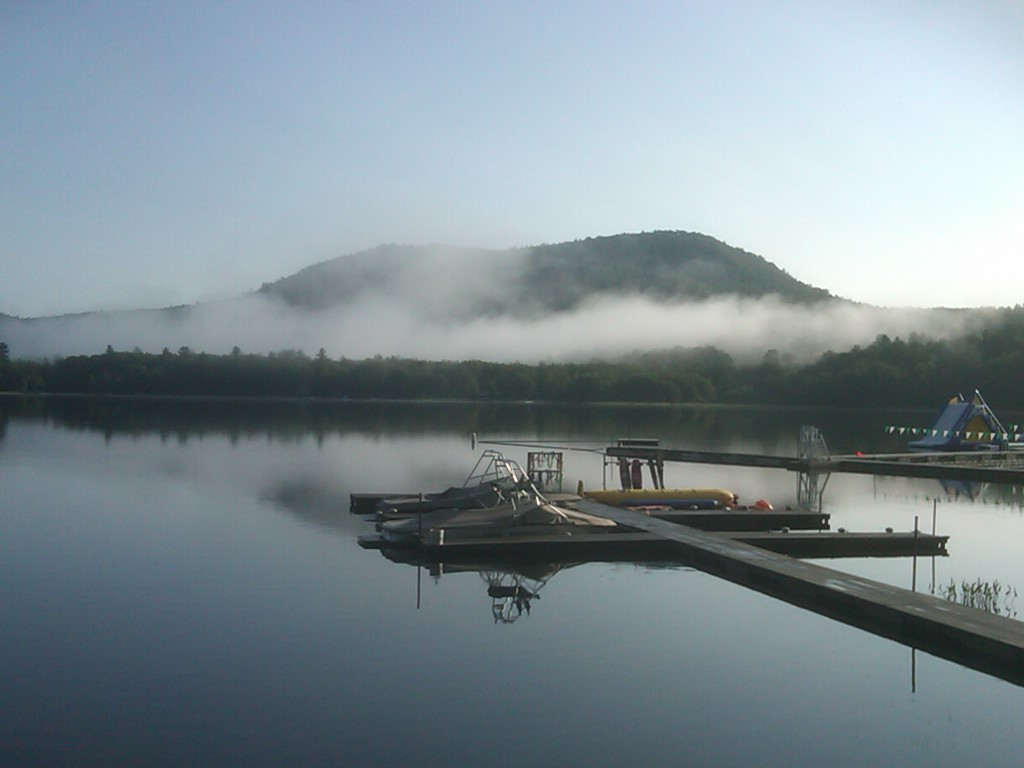
Little Bear Pond

=== Inter-Camps ===
Inter-camps are when two camps compete against each other in a specific sport. According to Ephram Caflun, although participants play competitively and certainly like to win, emphasis is placed on participation and sportsmanship.

== Traditions ==
=== College Weekend ===
During the first session, Wekeela has an all camp competition known as College Weekend. The camp is split into four teams. The four teams compete and are judged based on sport events, spirit events and sportsmanship.

=== Color War ===
During the second session, Wekeela has an all camp competition known as Color War. The camp is split into 2 teams. The two teams compete in various activities including sports, spirit events, silent meals, presentations and sportsmanship. The competition begins when the camp director crosses two hatchets, one green, one white. Immediately after, a ceremony called tap outs begins. Each camper is handed an either green or white bead, indicating what team they are on.

=== Campfires ===
Once a week Camp Wekeela has a campfire. Campers and counselors are encouraged to sing songs, tell jokes, read poems and tell stories. Camp fires are special because it is a time for the entire camp to get together as one in a place Wekeela calls the council ring.

== Notable people with associations to Camp Wekeela ==
- Willie Garson attended Camp Wekeela for 11 years.
- Patrick Dempsey attended Camp Wekeela.
- Terry Kirby spent a part of his summers teaching optional programs at Camp Wekeela such as football, strength/fitness and speed training.

== Accreditation ==
Camp Wekeela is an accredited member of the American Camping Association.
