= Incarnation Camp =

American non-profit year-round educational center and retreat

- Interactive map of Incarnation Camp
- Coordinates: 41.3543°N 72.4672°W
- Operated by: Incarnation Center
- Established: 1886
- Website: www.incarnationcamp.org

Incarnation Camp is a non-profit, traditional year-round camp, retreat and education center located in Essex, Connecticut. The camp was established in 1886. It is the oldest co-ed, continually operated camp in the United States. Each year, Incarnation hosts thousands of children and adults from across the US and around the world.

== Early history ==
In 1886, the Church of the Incarnation in Manhattan, located on Madison Avenue and 35th Street, New York City, rented a farmhouse in Mohegan Lake from R. Horne as part of a "fresh air" program sponsored by the New York Tribune. Children from the tenements of New York's lower East Side, many of whom immigrated here from Europe with their families during the 1880s, were taken from often squalid living conditions to spend a week in the fresh country air of Upstate New York. The Rev. Arthur Brooks of Incarnation persuaded his parishioners to rent the furnished farmhouse, and on June 19, 1886, 25 young boys and girls from the east side of Manhattan became the first campers. Each summer, some 230 children benefited from the experience.

Eight years later, in 1894, Incarnation parish raised $7000 for the purchase of the farmhouse, an adjacent barn and five acres "to be used for the purposes of a summer home for the poor of the parish." Also that year, a parishioner made a contribution to have a swimming pool installed, complete with pumps that replenished it with water from Lake Mohegan, half a mile away. A second home was built in 1895, called Brooks Cottage, which was used specifically for the parish's Bethlehem Day Nursery. In 1925 Incarnation Camp was relocated to St. Johnsland in Kings Park, New York

== Later history ==
In 1929, Incarnation Camp was relocated to its permanent site on the border between Ivoryton and Deep River in Connecticut.

In 1949, Incarnation Camp was incorporated as a non-profit. The first chairman of the Board was John A. Bell.

The mile-long and spring-fed lake at the center of the camp property was created in 1873, when the Clarke family which owned the land at the time allowed the Comstock, Cheney and Co. piano makers to build a 20-foot dam that impounded a brook flowing through the property.

Water flowing from the lake powered the main shop of the company, which became Pratt, Read and Co. after a 1936 merger with a similar operation in Deep River. In early June 1982 the dam which held the mile long Bushy Hill Lake gave way due to heavy rain and drained the lake. That summer the camp operated successfully using remote swimming and boating facilities at Lake Messerschmidt. The following year Incarnation Camp was able to rebuild the dam because of a massive fund raising effort garnering donations from alumni and the local community including Katharine Hepburn

== Programs ==
Incarnation Center's programs include a year-round retreat and conference center, Bushy Hill Nature Center (which operates Bushy Hill Day Camp for campers aged 6–12), Incarnation Camp (co-ed sleepaway camp for campers aged 6–13), Pequot Sherwood Day Camp (co-ed day camp for campers aged 6–13), Pioneer Village (co-ed sleepaway camp for campers aged 14–16), Nature's Playground After School, Steward Outdoor School (a residential school for middle school students) and a variety of community-based education and recreation programs. Additionally, Incarnation hosts Nature's Classroom and a preschool.

== Naming ==
Although founded and now known as "Incarnation Camp", Incarnation has also been known as: "ECCC", "The Episcopal Camp & Conference Center," & Camp Pequot for Boys and Sherwood for Girls.

== Camp life ==
Incarnation's conference and retreat facilities offer a serene and natural setting that invites guests to relax as they reconnect with themselves and one another. The retreat center hosts a variety of groups throughout the year, including: youth & adult retreats, religious retreats, family reunions, weddings, choir camps, educational retreats, and more.

Incarnation's two day camps include Pequot Sherwood Day Camp and Bushy Hill Day Camp. Campers for both programs range in age from 4–15 years old. Through traditional camp activities and nature exploration, children gain leadership, teamwork and independence skills. Both day camp programs offer counselor in training programs.

Campers at Incarnation Camp (overnight camp) range from age 6 to 16. Campers sleep in 16 foot platform tents with their tent mates and counselors. Meals are served in Gibney Dining Hall. Pioneer Village is Incarnation Camp's program for teenage campers, ages 14–15. This program offers a more rustic camping experience. Campers work in groups to cook their own breakfasts and dinners over open fires daily. Campers go out on week-long wilderness excursions that include hiking on the Appalachian Trail, canoeing down the Connecticut River and biking along the New England Coast. If a Pioneer Village (see Programs, above) graduate is 16 or older at the start of the summer season, they may apply to become a Counselor's Assistant (CA) in an area of their choice. Many CAs go on to become Counselors once they are 18 or older.

== Activities ==
Incarnation Camp offers many activities (see below) in which campers can choose to participate. In addition to more typical camp activities such as athletics and swimming, Incarnation Camp has full facilities offering expert instruction in arts and crafts, ceramics, culinary arts, woodworking, primitive skills and performing arts.

Selected activities: Boating and Swimming Instruction, Ropes Course, Archery, Hiking, Drama, Land Sports, Arts and Crafts, Horseback Riding, Wilderness Trips, Farming

== Facilities ==
Incarnation Camp is located in Ivoryton, Connecticut on 740 wooded acres, which surround a mile-long private lake. Its facilities include a Conference/ Retreat Center that can accommodate 300 guests, campgrounds, a working farm, miles of hiking trails (open to the public Sept.- May), a Nature Center (Bushy Hill Nature Center), two Chapels, and more.

== Notable staff and alumni ==
- David Brooks, commentator for The New York Times and other publications
- Brewster Kahle, Founder and Digital Librarian of the Internet Archive.
- Rodri, Spanish footballer and Ballon d'Or winner
