= Camp Gray =

Catholic summer camp in Wisconsin

Coordinates: 43.542451°N 89.811248°W

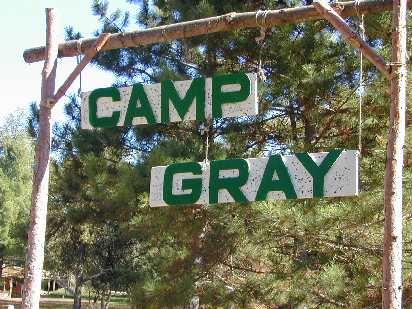
Camp Gray Entrance Sign

Camp Gray is a Catholic summer camp and retreat center located in Reedsburg, Wisconsin. It is a ministry of the Roman Catholic Diocese of Madison, Wisconsin, and is accredited by the American Camp Association (ACA). Its mission is to "To Know Christ and Make Him Known".

Camp Gray's summer program consists of ten one-week sessions for campers ranging in age from 7-18. Typical camp activities include archery, arts and crafts, and fishing. Camp Gray also serves as a retreat center.

== History ==
In 1953, Monsignor Francis Xavier Gray, pastor of St. Joseph Catholic Parish in Baraboo, Wisconsin, established the camp. He bought the original 100 acres (0.40 km^{2}) from a local businessman for $400. The original cabins started as ammunition crates from the nearby Badger Army Ammunition Plant.

In the early days, Camp Gray was a boys' summer camp, owned by St. Joseph Parish and directed by the parish priest. Summer camp started in 1958 under Fr. Francis Schmidt's direction. Four weeks of summer camp for boys were offered, and the counselors were diocesan seminarians.

In 1968 the Catholic Diocese of Madison, Wisconsin, incorporated the camp. In 1980, Fr. Larry Bakke's second summer as director, the first summer session for girls was held. In 1984 Camp Gray held its first co-ed session, and soon after became entirely co-ed. In 1994, Camp Gray hired its first lay director, Jake Czarnik-Neimeyer, who was succeeded in 1997 by Phil DeLong (Czarnik-Neimeyer's Assistant Director from 1994–1996). At the start of 2008, Jeff and Rebecca Hoeben, as co-directors, replaced DeLong. In 2023, Jeff Hoeben stepped down and Tim Chaptman, former camp assistant director, stepped up to be executive director. In September of 2026, Jason Anderson, former executive director of Catholic Youth Camp in the Diocese of Des Moines, became the new executive director of Camp Gray.
