= Camps Mohican Reena =

Summer camps in Palmer, Massachusetts, US

Camps Mohican-Reena were sleepaway camps founded in Palmer, Massachusetts, in 1928. For 36 summers through 1963, they were among the most highly regarded summer camps. The camp colors were green and gold.

== History ==
The brother-sister camps were located on Pattaquattic Pond (known to campers as Lake Aladdin); Mohican (boys) on the north shore and Reena (girls) on the south shore. Camp Mohican for Junior Gentlemen was founded by Rabbis Samuel Price and Morris Silverman in 1924. Rabbi Silverman was born in Newburgh, New York in 1894. He edited the High Holiday Prayer Book, popularly known as the "Silverman Machzor" in 1939 which became the official prayer book for Rosh Hashanah and Yom Kippur for the United Synagogue of America of the Conservative Movement for over half a century. Before the start of the fourth season in 1928, they became associated with Mr. Emanuel Halpern, Mr. Benjamin Jaffe, and Mr. Joseph Deitch. The girl campers were called "Little Ladies of the Camp;" the girls camp was renamed Camp Reena prior to the 1928 season. After 1928, the ownership consisted of Anna and Benjamin Jaffe, Minna and Joseph Deitch, Celia and Sam Knoll, and Minnie and Emanuel Halpern. The owners were primarily educators, living and working in Jewish educational institutions in the Brooklyn and the Bronx Boroughs of New York City. Joseph Deitch was the principal of the Jacob H. Schiff Center of the Bronx for more than 25 years and principal of the Kingsbridge Heights Jewish Center.

In 1952, the Deitch and Knoll families withdrew from ownership, selling their interests in Irving "Tarzan" Pearlman and Dr. Irving and Jackie Miller. Joe Deitch, beloved as "Uncle Joe," continued as a director until suffering a heart attack just before the start of the 1962 season. The Millers apparently only lasted one season, selling their interest to Frank Salz, the longtime head counsellor of Mohican. Frank Salz, a counsellor at Mohican from 1928, was an All-American basketball player, a teacher at Brooklyn Technical High School, and president of the Athletic Coaches Association of Greater New York.

Rickie Weiss, sister-in-law of the Helperns, served as Reena's head counsellor for many years through the summer of 1959, and was succeeded for four summers by Shirley Liebman. After the summer of 1958, the Helperns and Salz families sold their interests to Fern and Harold Fox of Woodmere, Long Island. The Helperns remained as directors through 1959, and Frank Salz continued as head counsellor of Mohican through 1960. Enrollment peaked at 400 campers in 1960, a large percentage of whom were children of campers and staff from the early years. As Harold Fox assumed control (Tarzan was largely responsible for buildings and grounds and the kitchen), long-term staff members departed and enrollment fell precipitously.

Tarzan died during the summer of 1962, and his brother Max assumed his role in 1963. By 1963, enrollment had decreased to 150 campers and the facility had physically declined dramatically. After the 1963 season, the camps closed. The property was purchased by Camp Ramah, and continues as a religious summer camp to this day.

At the end of every summer, trophies and cups were awarded to campers in such categories as Best Athlete and Best All Around Camper. Steven Gethers, an alumnus and Hollywood writer, dramatized the competition involved in the awarding these trophies in an episode of Playhouse 90 entitled Free Weekend, which was first aired on December 4, 1958. Guest stars included Kim Hunter, Martin Balsam, Charles Bickford, Jack Albertson, June Dayton, and Nancy Marchand.

Although the camps have been closed for more than 50 years, the alumni association remains vibrant, sponsoring annual dinners in New York City and semiannual reunions in late August in Palmer.

== Notable alumni ==
- Art Modell, former owner of the Cleveland Browns Football team who was vilified for having moved the team to Baltimore.
- Stuart Zonis, Stuart Damonas Dr. Alan Quartermane Sr. on General Hospital.
- Steven Gethers, TV and Hollywood writer.
- Mike Cingiser, Brown '62.
- Cynthia Harris, Theatre, TV and Movie actress.
- Matthew N. Harris, M.D., Professor of Surgery, NYU Medical Center
- Martin Feldstein1939-2019. Chairman of President Ronald Reagan's Council of Economic Advisers.
- Bella Savitsky Abzug She campaigned from the United States Congress with the slogan: "This woman's place is in the House—the House of Representatives.
- David Rosand Professor of Art History at Columbia University
- I.J. Kapstein English Professor at Brown University, and author of Something of A Hero.
- Carl Scheer, professional basketball executive, was born in 1936 in Springfield, Massachusetts. He graduated from Middlebury College in 1958 and received a law degree from the University of Miami in 1960. After practicing law in Greensboro, North Carolina for 9 years, he became Assistant to the Commissioner of the National Basketball Association (“NBA”) from 1969 to 1971, He became General Manager of the Buffalo Braves, an NBA team in 1971. Subsequent jobs included President and General Manager of the Carolina Cougars, an American Basketball Association team from 1971to 1974, and General Manager of the Denver Nuggets, from 1974. He left the Nuggets in 1984 to become president and General Manager of the Los Angeles Clippers, and then became the Commissioner of the Continental Basketball Association in 1986.

In 1988 he returned to the NBA as the first President and General Manager of the Charlotte Hornets.
