= Camp Merrie-Woode =

Historic district in North Carolina, United States

- U.S. National Register of Historic Places
- U.S. Historic district
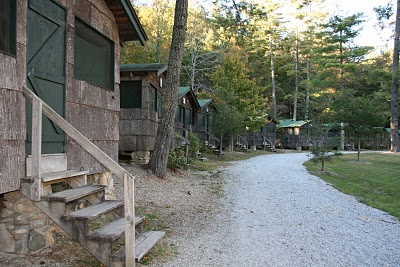
- Camp Merrie-Woode Cabins

- Location within North Carolina Location within the United States
- Location: US 64 N side, 1.6 miles N of jct. with NC 1120, at end of 1-miles-long dirt rd., near Cashiers, North Carolina
- Coordinates: 35°7′59″N 83°2′38″W
- Area: 15 acres (6.1 ha)
- Built: 1919
- Architectural style: Adirondack
- NRHP reference No.: 95000674
- Added to NRHP: June 2, 1995

Camp Merrie-Woode is a non-profit residential camp for girls ages 7–17 in the western hills of North Carolina with a history started in 1919. The camp resides beneath Old Bald and alongside Fairfield Lake in Jackson County. In 2005 there were twenty-eight U.S. states and four foreign countries represented with 85% of campers returning the following summer. Young ladies at Camp Merrie-Woode develop confidence by participating in activities such as horseback riding, sailing, hiking, rock climbing, theatre, and river trips down the Chattooga, Nantahala, French Broad, Nolichucky, and the 'mighty' Tuckaseegee River.

The North Carolina National Heritage Program lists Old Bald/Cherry Cove as one of the "significant natural areas of Jackson County" because of the forest of Northern Red Oaks in the region, as well as one of the two historic grassy balds in the county. The land is registered a U.S. National Heritage Area and is owned by a combination of the National Park Service, U.S. Forest Service, local, and private entities.

Camp Merrie-Woode operates as a 501(c)(3) non-profit educational institution.

Listed on the National Register of Historic Places for Jackson County in 1995 as a national historic district, Merrie-Woode is recognized for historical and architectural significance as a historic district that has been preserved in its original Adirondack style.

== History ==
=== Dammie Day and Mary Turk ===
Founded in 1919, Camp Merrie-Woode was directed for nearly thirty years by Mrs. Jonathon C. Day. Day, known to campers as Dammie, was born to British parents and established English traditions at the camp. She named the camp Merrie-Woode, writing that she selected the name because "it is a merry wood and campers will always make it so." Camp activities emphasized honor, simple living, and community service.

=== The Orrs ===
Following the 1951 season, the camp was sold to Mr. and Mrs. Fritz Orr of Atlanta who, with their son Fritz, Jr. and his wife, Dottie, operated Merrie-Woode until 1978. The Orrs were great outdoor enthusiasts and were especially instrumental in building strong canoeing and wilderness programs. Fritz, Jr. and Dottie's son, Fritz Orr III, grew up around Merrie-Woode and is a four-time national whitewater canoe champion.

=== Hugh Caldwell and the Merrie-Woode Foundation ===
Upon the Orrs' retirement in 1978, Hugh Caldwell, a University of the South philosophy professor and Merrie-Woode staff member since 1952, led alumnae to form the Merrie-Woode Foundation, a non-profit corporation with the sole purpose of owning and operating Camp Merrie-Woode®. Through the generous support of the Merrie-Woode family, the Merrie-Woode Foundation purchased the camp in December 1978. With the establishment of the Merrie-Woode Foundation, the camp is now in effect owned and operated by its former campers. Dr. Caldwell served as its first director through 1985 and was followed by Art and Carolyn Kramer. The Kramers were the directors from 1985 through 1989.

=== The Strayhorns ===
From 1990-2002, Laurie and Gordon Strayhorn served as the Executive Directors. The Strayhorns worked to maintain the historic architecture during a period of extensive renovations to many of camp's buildings and cabins.

=== The Dunns ===
From 2002 to 2022, Denice and Jim Dunn served as Executive Directors of Camp Merrie-Woode®. The Dunns continued the traditions founded by their predecessors. Jim's background is in education and Denice's background is in engineering, bringing a well rounded cadre of skills to the foreground to continue Camp Merrie-Woode's success. The Dunns maintained their home on the grounds of Camp Merrie-Woode®.

The Walkers

Robin and Frost Walker became Executive Directors of Camp Merrie-Woode in 2022, following the Dunn's retirement. Robin began her Merrie-Woode journey as a camper in 1989, became a Captain in 1996, and served as a cabin counselor and boating instructor for several summers. Frost traces his enthusiasm for the outdoors to summers as a camper at Camp High Rocks in Cedar Mountain, NC. A native of Greenville, SC, Frost first discovered his passion for rock climbing at camp and dedicated many years to becoming an expert level climber and outdoor adventure guide.

== Camp life and traditions ==
The cabins of Camp Merrie-Woode are rustic wooden structures with screened windows and electricity. A typical cabin consists of four to six campers of the same age and one or two counselors. These cabins share two modern bathhouses located directly behind the cabin line. Older campers live in larger cabins with eight to ten campers, two counselors, and built-in bathrooms.

All girls who attend Merrie-Woode wear the camp uniform. For the June and Main sessions, campers wear the traditional gray middie blouse, green tie, and dark green shorts. The uniform of the shorter August session consists of a gray Camp Merrie-Woode T-shirt and dark green shorts.

As a result of founder Dammie Day's British heritage, the camp is built around the legend of King Arthur and his Knights of the Round Table, particularly the tale of the Knights’ search for the Holy Grail. Many of the buildings around the camp take their names from these legends, such as the cabin of Camelot and the gymnasium, King Arthur's Court. At the end of each session, the oldest campers or staff members in camp present the traditional pageant of Follow the Gleam, reenacting the search for the Holy Grail.

== Activities ==
Camp Merrie-Woode offers more than twenty instructed activities, with a balance of traditional and adventure programming. Campers select eight activities at the June and Main sessions, while August session campers pick five to fill their schedule.

Traditional programming includes sports and nature, as well as visual and performing arts. Sports activities include archery, tennis, land sports, and tumbling. The camp offers a variety of arts classes, such as ceramics, jewelry, knitting, photography, weaving, sewing, and stained glass, as well as dance and drama in the performing arts. Adventure programming comprises the activities of boating, swimming, horseback riding, and mountaineering. Many activities have their own programs of progressive, level-based achievement, such as the Captains program in boating, the Horsemaster program in horseback riding and the King's Player program in drama. The programs are not required, but are enjoyed by many goal-oriented campers.

== Sessions and cost ==
Each summer at Merrie-Woode consists of three sessions: a three-week session at the beginning of June, a five-week Main session running through the end of July, and a ten-day August session geared toward younger and first-time campers. Apart from minor changes in atmosphere, the camp experience remains the same between each session (with the exception of minor differences mentioned above).

The table below illustrates common opening and closing dates for each session and provides the most recent cost per session.

Summer 2024	Start	End	Cost
June	Saturday, June 1	Friday, June 21	$5,790
Main	Sunday, June 23	Saturday, July 27	$7,990
August	Monday, July 29	Thursday, August 8	$3,590

== See also ==
- National Register of Historic Places listings in Jackson County, North Carolina
