= Camp Jones Gulch =

YMCA camp in California

Coordinates: 37.288°N 122.271°W

YMCA Camp Jones Gulch
- Formation: 1934
- Type: Summer camp
- Location: La Honda
- Executive Director: Carrie Herrera
- Affiliations: YMCA

Camp Jones Gulch is a YMCA summer camp in La Honda, California, in the Santa Cruz Mountains of the San Francisco Bay Area. It was founded in 1934 and encompasses 927 acres (375 ha) of redwood forests and meadows. During the summer, the YMCA of San Francisco operates overnight youth and family camps, and during the school year, the camp hosts retreats, in addition to weekly environmental education field trips operating as San Mateo Outdoor Education. From 1956 to 2020, it was also the home of San Joaquin County Outdoor Education.

== History ==
The Camp Jones Gulch property was originally part of Rancho San Gregorio, a stretch of land granted by Governor Juan Alvarado to Antonio Buelna. A portion of the land grant, which stretched nearly 18,000 acres, was later sold to Henry Wilkins, who, in 1857, sold the property to Jones & Franklin, a small milling operation. One of the company's owners, David Jones, for whom the gulch and camp is named, constructed a saw mill on the site, which stood where the present-day Dining Hall now sits. By the 1930s, Mrs. S. M. Black owned the property, and looked to sell her property to a non-profit organization to create a camp for boys and girls. Richard Perkins, then the General Secretary for the YMCA of San Francisco, negotiated a deal in 1934 to acquire the camp property.

In addition to weekend retreats and visits by other youth programs, Camp Jones Gulch has been used for environmental education programs since the mid-20th century. In the summer of 1965, Gus Xerogeanes, a natural sciences teacher for the San Bruno Park School District, organized a weeklong summer field trip for a group of sixth grade students, which expanded to a district-wide program for San Bruno students in the spring of 1966. Initially, only 60 students could attend the program due to space restrictions. In the fall of 1966, more San Mateo County school districts began participating in the program, so a county-managed San Mateo Outdoor Education program was approved in 1968 with 650 pupils. Since then, more than 200,000 students have attended Outdoor Education, and the program celebrated its 50th anniversary on March 9, 2019.

Similarly, in 1956, the San Joaquin Outdoor Education began as a pilot program with 49 students from Jefferson School in Tracy, California. Within three years, the program had expanded to the San Joaquin Outdoor School, the third largest environmental education program in California, serving 1,000 students from 28 districts throughout San Joaquin County. In 1960, the program expanded to provide weeklong trips throughout the entire school year. To accommodate the county's growth, the program expanded to a second nearby site, Redwood Glen, in 1990, although operations ceased at the camp in 2009. In 2018, the program celebrated 60 years at the Jones Gulch site. However, in January 2021, the San Joaquin County Office of Education announced plans to transfer their outdoor education programs to Sky Mountain in Placer County, California, in order to be in closer proximity to local students, ending their usage of Camp Jones Gulch.

== Camp property ==
Camp Jones Gulch spans 927 acres, approximately 700 of which remain undeveloped, except for small hiking trails leading to forest viewpoints and observation points. Over the years, several facilities have been added to the property, including dormitories and cabins, a wooded amphitheater ("Coyote Bowl"), a horse corral, and other activities for youth programs. Cabins, which are used as lodging for visitors throughout the year, are named for trees and birds that can be found within the area, in addition to the mining company magnate Frederick Worthen Bradley and Ohlone Native American tribe. To recognize the 50th anniversary of San Mateo Outdoor Education, the YMCA renamed several cabins from traditional names to the tree names used by the Outdoor Education program during the school year. As of summer 2021, the YMCA, in partnership with the San Mateo County Office of Education, is renovating six older cabins, paving the main parking lot, and updating the sewer and electrical systems. In 2022, Sempervirens Fund entered into a contract to purchase a conservation easement on Camp Jones Gulch, which will permanently protect its forest creeks and habitat.

A portion of the forest, nicknamed the Valley of the Giants, is home to "Big Red" and "Dead Fred", two towering redwoods frequented by youth visitors of the camp. A garden and straw bale classroom, maintained by the San Mateo Outdoor Education program, a pond with canoes, and Buckeye Grove also lie within the camp boundaries.

The gulch, and nearby Pescadero Creek County Park, sit atop a deposit of natural gas and oil. Crude oil seeps into Jones Gulch Creek on occasion, staining the rocks. Oil exploration was attempted in the area in the 1970s. Although it failed to hit the pool and no exploration wells have been attempted at the site, natural gas in the area has been estimated at 10 billion cubic feet. Along with Jones Gulch Creek, other creeks in the area are named after families that settled within La Honda, including Hoffman, Peterson, and Blomquist creeks.

== Structure ==
YMCA Camp Jones Gulch provides traditional residential summer programs to students of ages 6–16, with cabins organized by age and gender. Campers eat and participate in daily activities together, including swimming, archery, canoeing, climbing a rock wall, ziplining, arts and crafts, guided hikes, and more. There is also a day camp and specific week-long camps focused on themes including horseback riding, rock climbing, and whitewater rafting. In recent years, Camp Jones Gulch has added teen leadership programs, where middle and high school students develop leadership skills while working with peers and participating as counselors-in-training in cabins with younger campers. Counseling staff are attracted from across the globe, with many returning to work at camp after being campers themselves. Over the years, a steady YMCA Camp Jones Gulch Alumni group has developed, which organizes an annual reunion each summer. These events, along with weekend family camps organized by the YMCA, enable both children and their families to experience Camp Jones Gulch. Scholarships are provided to families who could not otherwise afford camps for their children, supported through donations and grants. Each summer for the past 55 years, space is rented to the Hayward–La Honda Music Camp for a week, a performing arts camp with music electives, master classes, and performances to approximately 280 students in grades 6–12.

== School year programs ==
The camp operates year-round, providing administrative, maintenance, and food service staff to user groups who attend during the school year. These groups include scout troops and jamborees, youth-based organizations, music camps, 4-H, school groups, Rotary Club leadership retreats, and tai chi and yoga retreats. During the COVID-19 pandemic, when Outdoor Education programs were temporarily closed, Camp Jones Gulch offered "family getaway" stays in cabins.

=== San Mateo Outdoor Education ===
Some students in San Mateo County's public schools attend San Mateo Outdoor Education, a weeklong residential school that teaches major concepts of ecology via the exploration of forest, pond, garden, tidepool, wetland, and sandy shore habitats. Students, who are usually fifth and sixth graders, sleep in cabins with bunk beds and eat meals family style in the Redwood Dining Hall. The program's mascot is the banana slug, which, by tradition, many students will "kiss" throughout the week. Between 150 and 180 students attend the program each week from September to May, under the supervision of high school- and college-aged cabin leaders and full-time naturalist staff, who are known by "nature names" instead of their full names, such as Dipper, Tahoe, and Fern. Weekly traditions include "Beach Day", which involves visits to local beaches in Pescadero; a night hike with fellow cabinmates; exploring the garden, which is home to various vegetables, chickens, and composting stations; and cabins performing to the full group at campfire. The school uses songs from the Banana Slug String Band, whose members include the current Principal of the Outdoor Education program and the program's former director, who retired after 26 years in June 2022.

=== San Joaquin Outdoor Education ===
Likewise, through the 2019–2020 school year, approximately 4,500 fifth and sixth graders in public, private, and parochial schools in San Joaquin County attended Camp Jones Gulch for the weeklong San Joaquin Outdoor Education program. Although these students, along with teachers and high school cabin leaders, were lodged in separate cabins, many participated in similar activities to San Mateo students, including hikes through the forest, Beach Day trips, and night hikes. By tradition, each student attending the program would reach to touch a Redwood tree to make a wish while crossing the "Wishing Bridge" over Jones Gulch creek, and walk backwards across the "Backwards Bridge", which, according to legend, was home to a troll. Through pre- and post-evaluations of student understanding, the program tracked an overall increase in student curiosity and knowledge of science concepts.
