= Rocky Mountain Conservatory Theatre =

American youth theater organization

Rocky Mountain Conservatory Theatre is a youth theater organization located in Colorado and Florida and was founded in 2007 by Anthony Hubert. RMCT holds an annual summer camp, numerous child-cast productions throughout the year, as well as acting conservatory classes for children and adolescents ages 5–18. Rocky Mountain Conservatory Theatre (RMCT) hosted its Colorado programs at the University of Denver from 2007 through 2010 and at Denver's Colorado Heights University from 2011 to 2013 (DU & CHU), and at The Jewel STAGE at Jewel Church Denver starting in 2013 RMCT has hosted its Florida programs at the Mizner Park Cultural Arts Center, the Boca Raton Community Center, and Saint Andrews School and now is at Boca Stage of UUFBR near Boca Town Center Mall. They offer Acting Conservatory Classes and Summer Theater Camp in Boca Raton, FL. Their slogan is "Unprecedented Youth Theatre".

== Awards and recognition ==
Rocky Mountain Conservatory Theatre was awarded the prestigious "Kids Pages" Best Places for Families 2008 in the 'Best Theatre Classes' category. More than 200,000 people voted in the Denver metro area.

Rocky Mountain Conservatory Theatre was also awarded distinctions from Colorado Parent in their 2009 Family Favorites Contest. They ranked #1 in 'Summer Camps' and also in the 'Theatre Groups' category, and then again in 2010, 2011, 2012, and 2013.
