= Camp Westwind =

Summer camp in Oregon, United States

Coordinates: 45.045154°N 123.99922°W

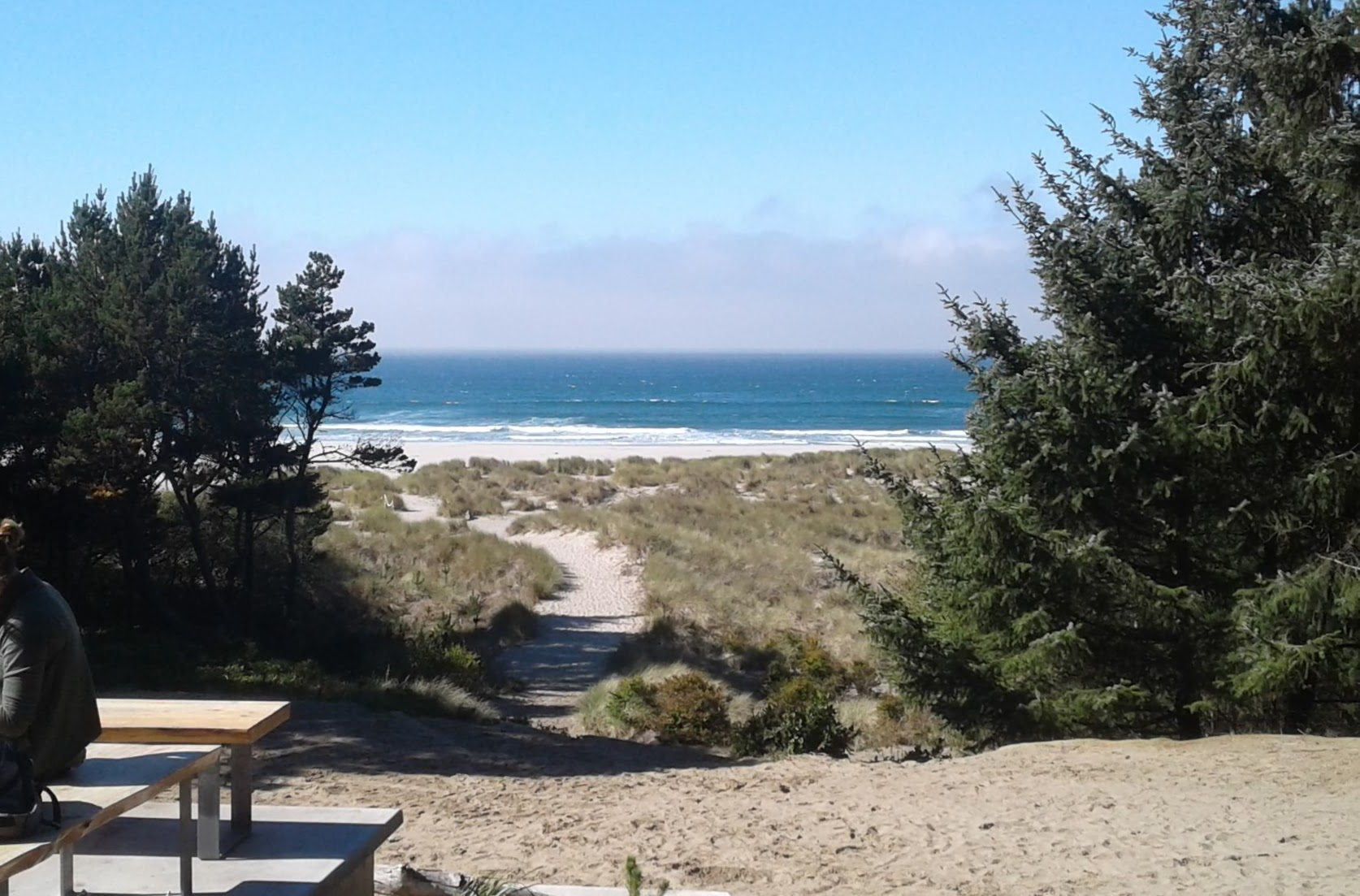
View from Wilson Lodge at Camp Westwind in October 2018

Camp Westwind is a summer camp on the Oregon Coast in the United States, that takes place at the historic 'Westwind' property just north of Lincoln City and south of Cascade Head.

== Extent ==
The camp comprises 529 acres (2.14 km^{2}), touching the Salmon River and the Pacific Ocean and borders Route 101 on the east. However, the sandy beaches are not part of Camp Westwind and are under the jurisdiction of the Oregon Parks and Recreation Department.

== History ==
The land was once inhabited by the Nechesne, a Salish speaking tribe of the Oregon Coast, also known as the Salmon River Indians.

Founded in 1936 (first camp sessions in 1937), the camp was run by the YWCA of Greater Portland until September, 2013, when the camp program was acquired by the Westwind Stewardship Group (WSG). In 2006, the Westwind property was purchased by the newly formed Westwind Stewardship Group (founded in 2004), an organization of former campers, counselors and Westwind guests dedicated to permanent protection of the Westwind landscape and its use as an educational retreat and camp. The camp remains accredited by the American Camp Association.

== Camp activities ==
Activities at the camp include kayaking, canoeing, standup paddleboarding, archery, challenge course, mud mucking, Gaga ball, volleyball, arts and crafts, camping skills, and hiking. Camp Westwind previously included horse riding as part of the program activities. Camp Westwind also has a 9-hole disc golf course, over 10 miles of trails, and four miles of waterfront (including a mile of beach). Camp programs for children (ages 7–17) and families (all ages) run throughout the summer and on weekends during Spring, Fall, and Winter.

Westwind hosts Fall and Spring Stewardship weekends where guests volunteer on-site and facility projects. Westwind also hosts a community Earth Day event in April and a Visitor's Day in June.

Westwind is a host site for the Multnomah Education Service District's Outdoor School program, a youth camp that recruits high school volunteers to teach 6th-grade students about nature and conservation.
