= YMCA Hayo-Went-Ha Camps =

Michigan State YMCA boys and girls camps

- Nickname: HWH; THWH; AHWH
- Formation: 1904
- Founders: Lincoln E. Buell; William Gay; Charles Wagner
- Headquarters: 919 NE Torch Lake Dr; Central Lake, Michigan 49622
- Location: United States
- Chief Executive Officer: John "JC" Carlson
- Director of Camp Torch Hayo-Went-Ha: Jack LaGoy
- Director of Camp Arbutus Hayo-Went-Ha: Mackenzie "MackMo" Morison
- Parent organization: State YMCA of Michigan
- Website: hayowentha.org

YMCA Hayo-Went-Ha Camps is an arm of the State YMCA of Michigan which administers a pair of camps in northwestern Michigan. Founded in 1904 with the establishment of YMCA Camp Hayo-Went-Ha for Boys, the organization offers year-round outdoor activities. The primary focus of both camps is the summer program, which offers two- to four-week, single-gender camp experiences for children in 3rd through 11th grades. Other functions include outdoor education and challenge-course retreats for local schools, as well as cross-country skiing.

The arches on the veranda of the Boathouse, a building near the center of camping activity that houses waterfront activities, the camp store, and a common area. The Boathouse, built in 1907, is the oldest standing building at Hayo-Went-Ha and a recognizable symbol of the camp.

The camp's name is a variant of Hiawatha, legendary founder of the Iroquois Confederacy.

== YMCA Camp Torch/Hayo-Went-Ha for Boys ==
Camp Torch Hayo-Went-Ha for Boys lies in Central Lake Township in Antrim County, Michigan along the northeastern shore of Torch Lake (Antrim County, Michigan), occupying 640 acres (2.6 km^{2}) on a cape called Hayo-Went-Ha point. Founded in 1904 by the State YMCA of Michigan, the camp has operated continuously as a summer camp for boys between 4th and 11th grades. Buildings on the boys' camp have been named for generous donors and past campers, including Bonbright Lodge, given by a Flint Industrialist, the Dow Building, and the Stanley S. Kresge Lodge.

=== Summer programs ===
The camp offers overnight programs for different age groups, ranging from finished 3rd grade to 11th grade, as well as 2- or 4-week programs. These programs will go on various trips ranging from an overnight stay in the meadow on camp property for the youngest or 3 weeks of exploring the Alaskan wilderness for the oldest boys. Each group is categorized with a unique name under 3 divisions:

==== Pioneer Division ====
- Adventurer (Finished 3rd Grade, 2 Weeks)
- Trailblazer (Finished 4th Grade, 2 Weeks)
- Pathfinder (Finished 5th Grade, 2 Weeks)
- Pioneer (Finished 5th Grade, 4 Weeks)

==== Voyageur Division ====
- Voyageur (Finished 6th Grade, 2 Weeks)
- Bushwhacker (Finished 6th Grade, 4 Weeks)
- Trekker (Finished 7th Grade, 2 Weeks)
- Viking Sailor (Finished 7th Grade, 4 Weeks)
- Viking (Finished 7th/ Grade, 4 Weeks)

==== Bush Division ====
- Islander (Finished 8th Grade, 2 Weeks)
- Kayaker (Finished 8th Grade, 4 Weeks)
- Isle Royale (Finished 8th Grade, 4 Weeks)
- Rover (Finished 9th Grade, 2 Weeks)
- Bush Ranger (Finished 9th Grade, 4 Weeks)
- Navigator (Finished 9th/10th Grade, 4 Weeks)
- Alaska (Finished 10th Grade, 4 Weeks)

==== Leadership Corps ====
This program is for completed 11th-grade campers who are preparing to become future Hayo-Went-Ha staff.

== YMCA Camp Arbutus/Hayo-Went-Ha for Girls ==
During the 1980s, the State YMCA attempted to include girls in camping activities. In the early 1990s, a girls' camp was formed at nearby Bows Lake. This facility, however, proved to be insufficient for long-term use. The state YMCA then acquired Camp Arbutus (44.666728°N 85.513808°W), a camp south of Traverse City, Michigan, on Arbutus Lake, which became the new site of YMCA Camp Arbutus Hayo-Went-Ha for Girls.
