= Camp Greylock =

Summer camp in Becket, Massachusetts

Coordinates: 42.299167°N 73.068019°W

- Location within Massachusetts
- Location: 1525 Main St, Becket, Massachusetts 01223
- Established: 1916; 110 years ago
- Website: campgreylock.com

Camp Greylock is a boys' summer camp located in Becket, Massachusetts, United States. The land was purchased in the fall of 1915, and its opening summer was 1916. Its founders were three brothers, George, Gabriel ("Doc"), and Lou Mason. It is currently the oldest continuously operating, private, all-boys' summer camp in Massachusetts.

== Notable campers and staff ==
Notable campers and staff of Camp Greylock include:

- Stephen Albert, composer and Pulitzer Prize winner
- Jacob M. Appel, writer and playwright
- Eliot Asinof, author
- Alistair Burt, member of Parliament
- Sam Coslow, composer
- R.J. Cutler, filmmaker, documentarian, television producer and theater director
- Robert Evans, movie producer
- Peter Falk, actor
- Douglas Feith, Undersecretary of Defense for Policy for United States President George W. Bush
- Lawrence Frank, NBA Basketball Coach and former head coach of the Nets & Pistons
- Michael Gordon, stage actor; stage and film director
- Peter Grosz, comedian
- David Hallyday, singer and automobile car racer
- Lawrence Halprin, architect
- Joseph Hirsch, painter
- Nat Holman, Basketball Hall of Fame player and coach
- Walter Hoving, businessman
- Conrad Janis, actor
- Julian Koenig, advertiser
- Eric Ladin, actor
- Edward Lampert, businessman and chairman of Sears Holding Corporation
- Lewis Lehrman, historian, author, and gubernatorial candidate
- Alan Jay Lerner, Broadway lyricist
- Fredric Lieberman, author and musicologist
- Josh Malina, actor
- Stanley Marcus, businessman
- Swede Masin, legendary high school and college athlete, and subject of a Phillip Roth novel
- Billy Mills, Olympic gold medalist
- James Newman, actor
- Ron Perelman, businessman
- Marc E. Platt, film, television and theatre producer
- George R. Roberts, businessman
- Darren Rovell, broadcaster
- Josh Safdie, filmmaker
- Lionel Stander, actor in films, radio, theater and television; Golden Globe award winner
- Julian Steward, anthropologist and developer of theories of cultural ecology and cultural change
- Jonathan Tisch, businessman
- Michael Weiner, executive director of the Major League Baseball Players Association
- Bruce Weitz, actor
- Stuart Weitzman, shoe designer
- David L. Wolper, television and film producer, Academy Award winner
- Jack Goldburg, Founder of Yes Chef Group and Jack's Dining Room
