= Phantom Lake YMCA Camp =

Camp located in Mukwonago, Wisconsin, United States

Coordinates: 42.846312°N 88.350200°W

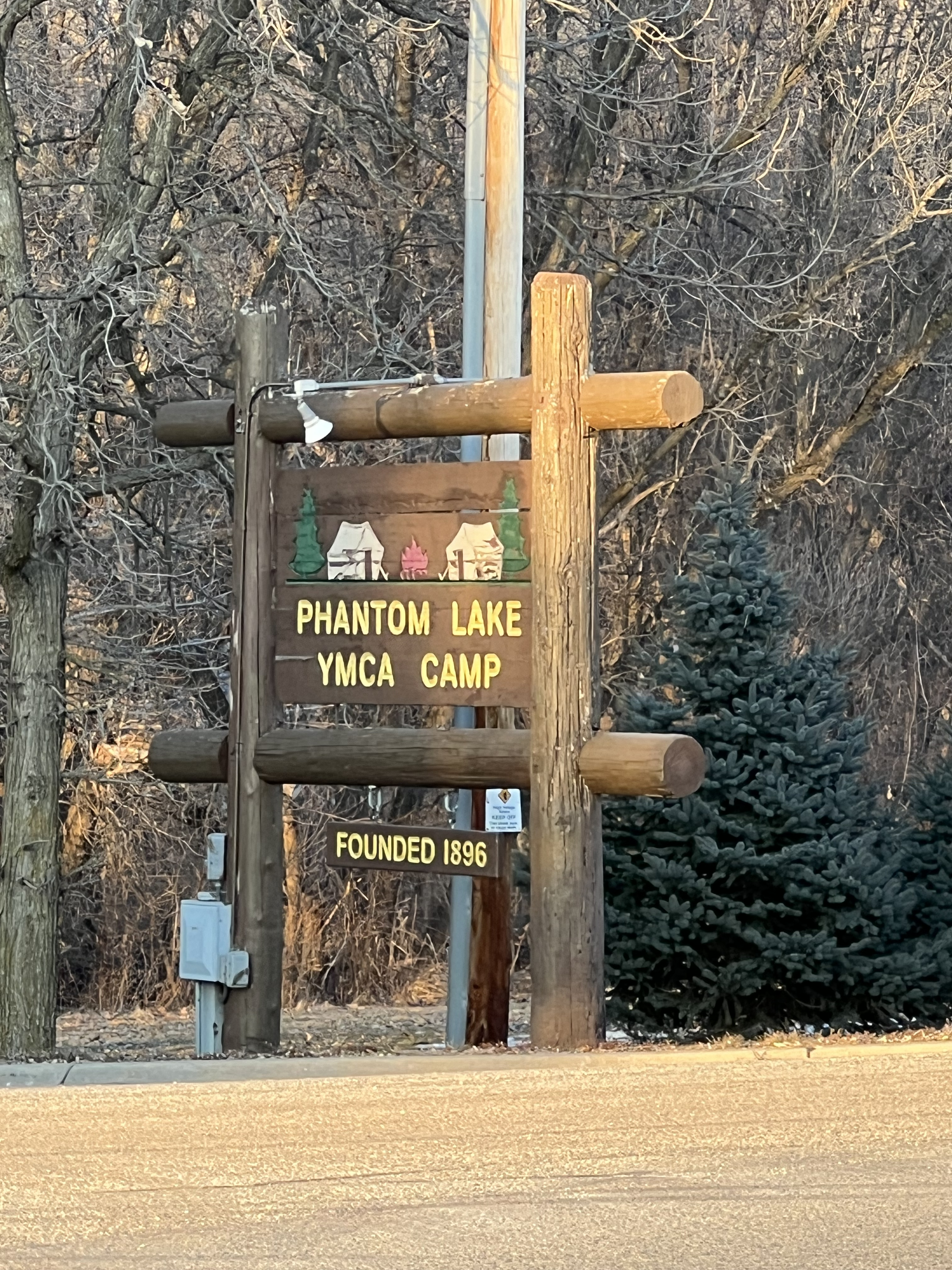
- Location: Mukwonago, Wisconsin, United States
- Type: Overnight, day camp
- Land: 72 acres (29 ha)
- Facilities: 25 platform tents, Carman Welcome Center, Alfrod Lodge, Dining Hall, Health Lodge, Lakefront access for swimming and boating, Athletic Field, Zipline and Highropes, Program Areas for campfires, archery, games and more
- Established: 1896
- Website: www.phantomlakeymca.org

Phantom Lake YMCA Camp is a YMCA camp located in Mukwonago, Wisconsin, United States. Founded in 1896, it is the oldest operating YMCA camps in North America.

== Summer camping programs ==
- Resident camp: Campers ages 7–16 come for one week sessions. Campers are assigned to tents based on ages and grade level.
- Day camp: A one-week day camping experience for youth ages 3–14.

== Year-round activities ==
- The Hollows at Phantom Lake: A Halloween themed fundraiser held every October.
- Family camp: Family camps over Labor Day Weekend and the weekend prior to Labor Day Weekend.

== Activities ==
- Boating: Sailing, canoeing, paddle boarding, sea kayaking, and funyaking (inflatable kayaking)
- Swimming
- Arts and crafts
- Archery
- Riflery
- Zip line and high ropes course
- Land sports: Basketball, floor hockey and soccer
- Dance
- Music
- Theater
