= YMCA Camp Tecumseh =

Coordinates: 40.608605°N 86.769380°W

YMCA Camp Tecumseh Outdoor Center is located in Indiana near the towns of Brookston, Indiana and Delphi, Indiana on the Tippecanoe River. The closest large city to Camp Tecumseh is Lafayette, Indiana, which is just across the Wabash River from West Lafayette (home of Purdue University). Camp Tecumseh was established in 1924 when citizens of Delphi raised $3000 to purchase the land which lies on a bend on the Tippecanoe river. The camp is named after Tecumseh, a Shawnee chief. Camp Tecumseh is fully accredited by the American Camping Association and currently serves over 4,000 campers every summer from throughout the midwest USA and the world. Camp Tecumseh is also open throughout the year, providing an Outdoor Education service for schools and a facility for retreats and conferences of all kinds. The facility serves over 30,000 people per year. It is an independent YMCA branch and is operated independently of other metro YMCAs.

== History ==
In 1922, the YMCA of Indiana wanted to establish camps in Indiana. Most YMCAs in the state were too small to host a camp on their own, so regional camps, combining the resources of several YMCAs were pursued as the solution. The YMCA of Indiana raised funds for property in southern part of the state near Bedford, Indiana. The fund drive a success, netting the over $20,000 needed to establish their first State YMCA camp, Camp Bedford in 1923.

The success of the Camp Bedford campaign encouraged a drive for a YMCA State Camp to be placed in Northern Indiana. The citizens of Delphi, Indiana presented a petition to the YMCA of Indiana asking that the camp be placed at a Carroll county site located on the Tippecanoe river, one of many sites under consideration for the new Northern Indiana State camp. The owner of the proposed site was J. Reid McCain, a local farmer, who promised to sell the 30 acres (120,000 m^{2}) for $3,000 for the camping site. The YMCA of Indiana the pledged that if Delphi could provide the $3,000 for the land, keep a good road to the camp, and insure a "friendly attitude" towards the camp that they would agree to the Carroll county site for the new camp. In a burst of activity and a one-day fund drive, the citizens of Delphi provided a total of $3,775 for purchase of the land.

The new Northern Indiana State Camp to be founded on the Tippecanoe River was not yet named, so a "name-the-camp" contest was conducted by the YMCA of Indiana. The grand prize was a free two-week stay at the new camp. Jack Fisher, an 11-year-old from Battle Ground, Indiana submitted "Camp Tecumseh," a name closely associated with the local history, which includes the Battle of Tippecanoe. Fisher's contribution won the contest and he attended the first session of camp held in 1924.

Girls camps have always been included at Camp Tecumseh. Camp sessions in 1924 included two 10-day sessions for girls and three for boys. In 1965, separate sessions ended following the national YMCA's push for co-educational camping.

Camp Tecumseh has also closely allied itself with other youth organizations from the early days, and 1924 included a "Week for Agricultural Clubs" which became known as "4-H Camp." This camp continues yearly to the present day.

In 1924 cabins were not complete, and campers stayed in tents. Early Camp Tecumseh cabins were wood frames with canvas roofs and canvas sides. Eventually the canvas was replaced by wooden shutters, but the same basic cabin structures were used until they were replaced in 1979. One of these old cabins remains on the camp grounds as a historical monument.

All waterfront activities were held in the Tippecanoe river until 1950, when concerns over pollution and possible infections to campers prompted a drive to build a pool. The main donor for the pool was then President of the Camp Committee, Joe Shirk. The pool, along with an additional pool added in 1996 remain in use today. In 1991, Camp Tecumseh held a fund drive to build a man made lake. Karl and Marietta Kettelhut gladly met this request by providing 95% of the donations. They deferred the name of the lake to Camp Director Dick Marsh because he had been so instrumental in the formation of Camp Tecumseh. There is now a chapel above the lake to thank the Kettelhut's for their contribution. The lake allowed campers to once again swim in a "natural" body of water, and is a camper favorite.

In 1968, the Illinois and Indiana YMCAs merged to become the new Region I of the YMCA of the USA. With this change many involved in the operations of Camp Tecumseh felt that they no longer wanted to have to rely on YMCA hierarchy for the support of camp they needed. Much of the facility was out of shape and at various points during the 1960s board members feared that Tecumseh would be shut down by the YMCA of Indiana due to financial difficulties. The next logical step for the Camp Tecumseh was to become an independent YMCA. On October 16, 1970, Camp Tecumseh requested Independent YMCA status, which was granted by the YMCA of the USA the next day.

== Programs ==
Today, Camp Tecumseh YMCA hosts a variety of both summer camp programs and retreats and events throughout the year. The most popular summer program is general Resident's Summer Camp, which serves children aged 8–15. These campers stay for one-week or two-week long sessions in a cabin with approximately ten campers and two counselors. They are divided into one of four units based on their age: Braves (8–10), Blazers (11–12), Warriors (13), and Pathfinders (14–15). Every activity is specially designed around the ages of campers within the units, in able to ensure the best possible experience for each camper.

In 2004, the growth of the summer camp program had expanded so much that new facilities had to be built to support the vast number of campers. Camp Tecumseh responded by building new cabins, a new lodge, and a new chapel near the Richard G. Marsh Lake. This area of camp became known as Lake Village and today serves the Warrior and Pathfinder campers. The original central hub of camp, now referred to as River Village, primarily serves the Brave and Blazer campers.

In addition to the general Summer Camp, Camp Tecumseh also offers an Equestrian program for campers aged 11–15. These campers participate in many of the same fun activities as the Resident campers, with a bigger emphasis on equine skills development. Equestrian campers spend every morning or afternoon with “their” horse and practice grooming and riding.

Also, for campers aged 13–17, there are Adventure Trip programs available. These are one to two adventures that take the campers on an unforgettable journey to some of America's most beautiful outdoor destinations. Types of adventure trips include whitewater rafting, sailing, and horsepacking.

When campers reach the age of 15 and can no longer return to summer camp, they have the option of returning for the two-week Campers In Leadership Training (CILT) Program. This program is for campers who have completed their sophomore year of high school and wish to further develop their leadership skills. They receive a "behind the scenes" look on the workings of camp and have the ability to directly shadow and learn from older Day Camp and Resident Camp counselors.

During the fall, winter, and spring months, Camp Tecumseh hosts a multitude of Outdoor Education programs for primary schools. These programs include Pioneer Heritage (Indiana History) for grades 3–5, Earthship Journey (Environmental Awareness) for grades 4–6, Foundations for Success (Character Development) for grades 6–8, Discovering Nature (Environmental Awareness) for grades 1–3, Christmas in the Colonies (Indiana History) for grades 3–5, and Project American Life (Citizenship) for grades 5–8.

Camp Tecumseh also hosts many outdoor retreats and events for groups such as Indian/Adventure Guides & Princesses, Girl Scouts, Boy Scouts, church groups, conferences, and family camps. The Tecumseh Leadership Center also holds year-round events for high school and college groups, corporate groups, and other conferences. It hosts yearly quilting camps and sometimes even family reunions.
