= Camp Beaverbrook =

Summer camp in California, US

- Established: 1961
- Founders: Robert and Marian Brown
- Defunct: 1985
- Coordinates: 38.854360°N 122.760930°W

Camp Beaverbrook was a co-educational overnight summer camp located at 14117 Bottle Rock Road, Cobb, California, near Cobb Mountain, in Lake County, California, from 1961 to 1985.

== History ==
Camp Beaverbrook was founded in 1956 by Robert and Marian Lessman Brown of Orinda, California, opening to campers in 1961. Known as Amee and Niha, Pomo language for "Father" and "Mother," in honor of the Pomo people indigenous to the area, the Browns operated the camp until their retirement in 1979. In later years, the camp was operated by Ronald and Lynn Garrison of Auburn, California.

== Activities ==
Camp activities included riflery, archery, horseback riding, hiking, nature walks, backpacking, arts and crafts projects, drama (the camp regularly produced several musicals each summer), swimming, water skiing at nearby Clear Lake, music, volleyball, boating and overnight canoe trips on the Russian River.

Campers, known as "Beaverbods", were mainly from the San Francisco Bay Area, though some came from as far away as Europe, Mexico, Canada and Japan. A unique feature of the camp was a relative lack of competitiveness. Campers were rarely put into direct competition with one another, rather, a supportive and mutually nurturing environment was cultivated. Thousands of youngsters attended the camp, and a Yahoo! interest group exists for them to stay in touch with one another as well as a dedicated Facebook group.

Like most sleep away summer camps, Camp Beaverbrook lived and thrived as an isolated community, cut off from the outside world. Campers were deprived of television, radio, candy, hair dryers, and many other creature comforts. While a rigid daily structure was in place, there was also an abundance of choice and each day included several unstructured "free time" periods. Each camper could select his or her own activities for the day at the beginning of each activity period with as many as seven or eight choices.

A large contingent of campers came back year after year and some stayed for several sessions each summer. Many campers came for three or four or even five summers in a row. A few campers returned for more than ten summers, many went on to become counselors.

== Legacy ==
Matthew C. "Flash" Callahan, who attended Camp Beaverbrook from 1977–1985, developed a one-man show, Campfire Stories, loosely based on his camp experiences. In 2010, Callahan completed a 68-minute documentary film, Beaverbrook, that screened at the Black Hills Film Festival, DocUtah, and San Francisco DocFest in 2011. The documentary was broadcast as part of KQED's Truly CA documentary series in 2012.
