= Happiness Is Camping =

Coordinates: 41.0171°N 74.9281°W

- Type: Not-for-profit
- Purpose: A camp for children with cancer and their siblings
- Location(s): 62 Sunset Lake Road, Hardwick, NJ 07825
- Members: ACA accredited
- Website: https://www.happinessiscamping.org

Happiness Is Camping is a non-profit ACA-accredited overnight camp for kids with cancer, ages 6–16, and their siblings. The camp is located on 145 acres in Hardwick, New Jersey, United States. Happiness Is Camping is free to all who attend, and is recognized by the IRS as a 501(c) (3) organization.

== History ==
Founded by Murray Struver, the camp originally served as a retreat for inner-city kids to spend time in the country. The camp's focus changed when the daughter of Struver's close friend was unable to attend because she was diagnosed with cancer. After testing for a week with kids with cancer, Happiness Is Camping began taking form. Since its founding in 1981, the camp has hosted over 18,000 children from over 25 different hospitals.

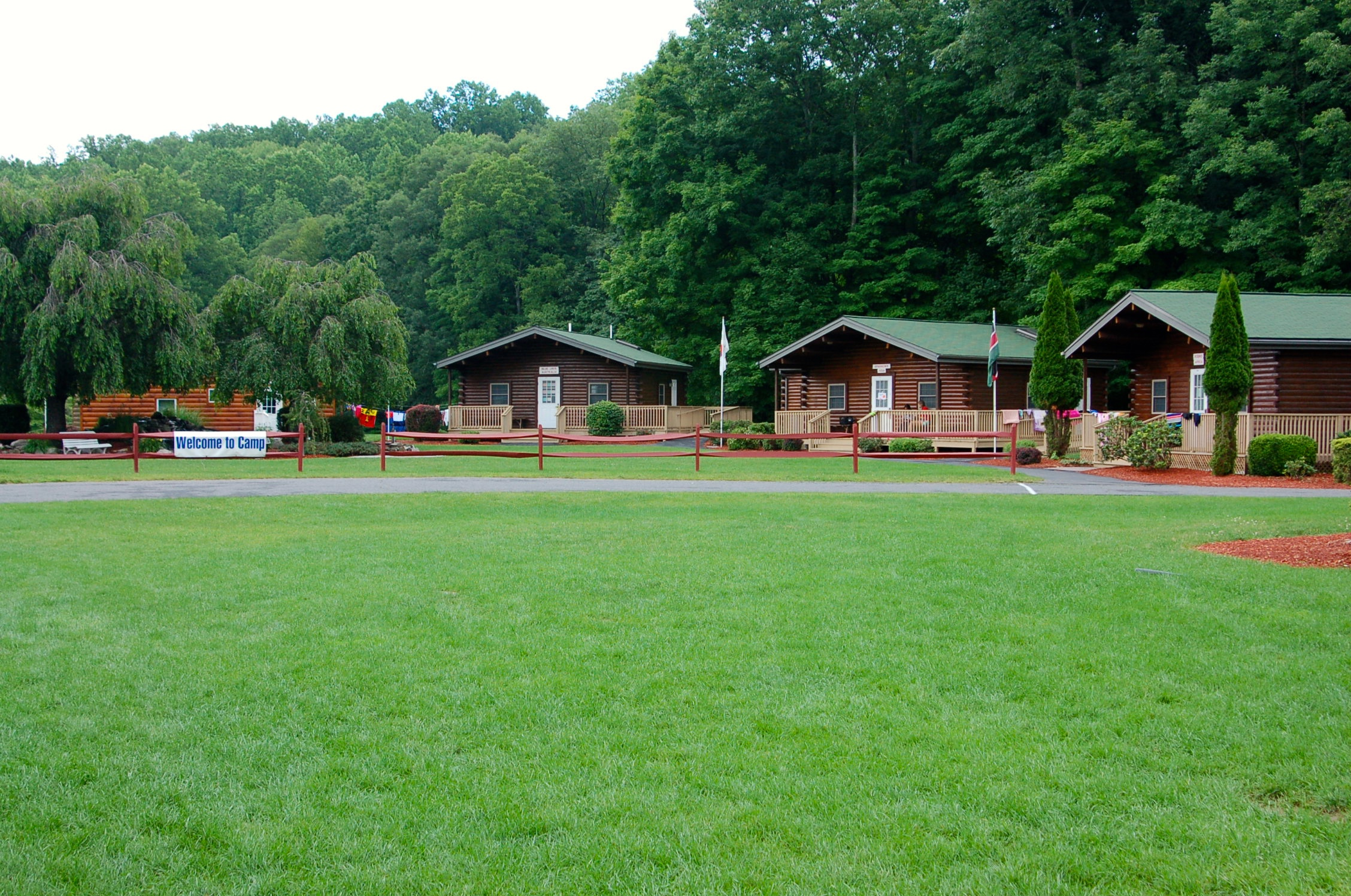
International Village

== About ==
Happiness Is Camping's summer camp program consists of five one-week long sessions held in July. Over the five weeks, the camp hosts nearly 350 children with cancer and siblings. The camp is free to all who attend, and is funded through a combination of private and corporate donations and grants. The camp is staffed by paid counselors and nearly 40 volunteers, including volunteer medical staff from hospitals including Memorial Sloan Kettering Cancer Center and Children's Hospital of Montefiore.

Campers choose their activities, including zip lining, dodgeball, art and crafts, archery, climbing, and swimming. Facilities include nine cabins, a gym, a pool, an office building, the Health Center, an arts and crafts room, a cafeteria, a rock climbing wall, and a zip line that runs above a small lake on the property. All buildings on the property are temperature controlled and handicap accessible.

== Medical care ==
Happiness is Camping’s medical staff includes volunteer physicians and nurses from Memorial Sloan Kettering Cancer Center and Children's Hospital of Montefiore. These physicians and nurses also participate in activities with the campers, allowing them to interact outside of a hospital setting. The Health Center is equipped to handle 24-hour-a-day, ongoing care. The Health Center also serves children requiring chemotherapy and those at risk of bleeding and infection.

== Accreditation ==
- ACA accredited
- Children’s Oncology Camp Association, International - Gold Ribbon Camp since 2011
- KOA Care Camp Grant recipient
