= Camp Kabeyun =

Summer camp in Alton, New Hampshire, US

Coordinates: 43.5258°N 71.2527°W

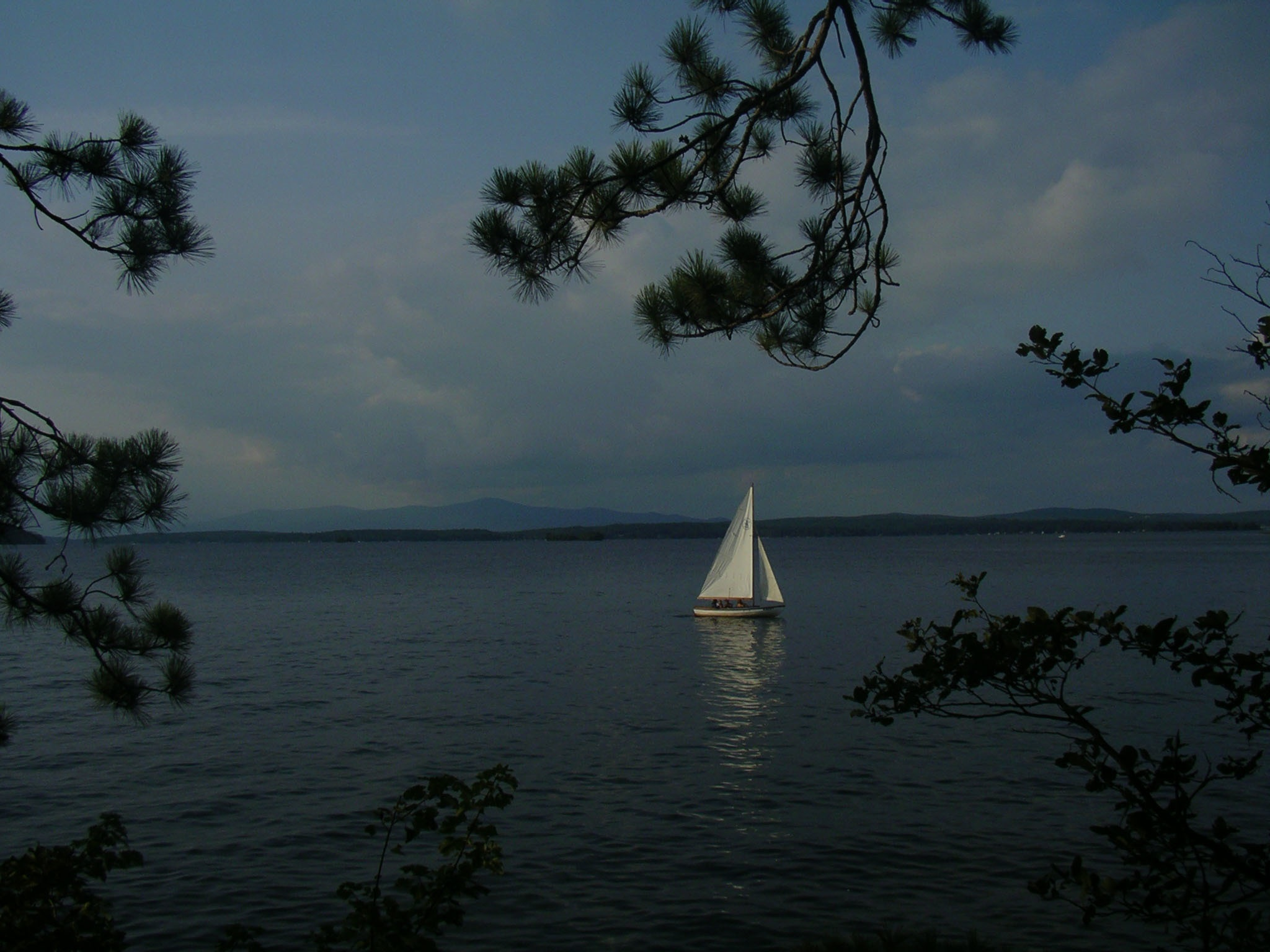
A camp sailboat on the lake, seen from Kabeyun

Camp Kabeyun is a summer camp for boys founded in 1924 by educator John Porter. It sits on 85 acres on the south end of Lake Winnipesaukee in Alton Bay, New Hampshire. Kabeyun's program is designed to encourage boys' individual growth, self-awareness, and confidence in the context of community living. Boys at Kabeyun choose their own activities each morning and again at lunch. This method give boys maximum freedom. Another point is that Camp Kabeyun has almost no involuntary classes. Activities include land and water sports, projects such as photography and leather working, and adventure trips, often in the White Mountains. Kabeyun has a high staff return rate and many counselors who are former campers. Former camper and counselor Josh Wolk wrote a memoir, Cabin Pressure, based on Kabeyun. The University of Michigan's New England Literature Program is also hosted at Camp Kabeyun during the spring.

== Notable alumni ==
- David Hyde Pierce, actor
