= Camp Diana-Dalmaqua =

Jewish summer camp in New York, US

Coordinates: 41.453°N 74.811°W

Camp Diana-Dalmaqua was a Jewish summer sleepaway camp in Glen Spey in the Catskill Mountains of New York State. Founded in the 1920s as two separate camps, Diana-Dalmaqua was typical of the numerous camps which served (and still serve) the children of the New York City metropolitan area. The camp was typical of many in the area offering a variety of activities including sports, drama and arts and crafts.

== Notable alumni ==
- Sandy Baron
- Robert Iger
- Penny Marshall
- Laurie Korn Mika
