= Alpine Camp for Boys =

Christian summer camp

- Location within Alabama
- Location: Mentone, Alabama
- Coordinates: 34.505°N 85.611°W
- Type: Summer camp
- Owner: Glenn and Carter Breazeale
- Established: 1959
- Website: alpinecamp.com

Alpine Camp for Boys (also known as Alpine Camp and Camp Alpine) is a ACA certified non-denominational Christian sleep-away summer camp on Lookout Mountain, Alabama.

The camp is located on the Little River in the town of Mentone, Alabama across the river from DeSoto State Park. It is a camp for boys graduating from kindergarten to 9th grade (throughout different terms). The camp was included in Newsweek's list of America's best summer camps in 2024.

== History ==
Colonel Milford Howard built a lodge cabin near the camp after claiming the land in 1928. Until 1934, it was operated as a resort, when Alice McVicar converted it to Alpine Lodge Camp for Girls. The camp was purchased by Richard "Dick" O'Ferrall and Rufus Hyde who formed the Alpine Camp for boys in 1959.

In 1962, Hyde retired from the camp, and O'Ferrall became full owner. In 2006, Dick O'Ferrall retired (but still remained on and around the camp), and Glenn and Carter became co-owners of the camp. In 2022, Dick O'Ferrall passed away. The camp is now operated by his daughter and son-in-law.
