= Camp Lohikan =

Summer camp in The Poconos

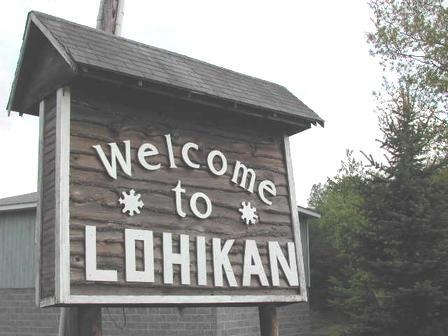
- Interactive map of Camp Lohikan
- Location: Lake Como, Pennsylvania, U.S.
- Coordinates: 41.851334°N 75.300883°W
- Season: Summer
- Website: https://www.lohikan.com/

Camp Lohikan was a summer camp in The Poconos in Lake Como, Pennsylvania. The summer camp serves boys and girls ages 6–15.

Mike and Arlene Buynak founded Camp Lohikan in 1957. In 1983, the managing of the camp was turned over to their son Mark Buynak.

== History ==
Mike and Arlene Buynak founded Camp Lohikan in 1957. In 1983, the managing of the camp was turned over to their son Mark Buynak. The camp is non-denominational. Camp Lohikan has more than 200 employees, from all over the United States and the world.

Camp Lohikan is a co-ed sleepaway camp set in the Pocono Mountains in Lake Como, Pennsylvania. Campers can participate in archery, circus performance, fishing, tennis, soccer, and other activities. The younger age groups (what the camp refers to as juniors and super juniors- ages ranging from 5 to 10 years old) go around to scheduled activities with counselors. Super juniors do a two-week program to get adjusted to camp life and then they make their own schedule. The other campers, ranging from ages 11 to 15, go to activities on their own.

June 2026 it was disclosed that Camp Lohikan will be closing after the 2026 season. The camp and all facilities have been sold to neighboring all boys Camp Morasha.
