= Camp Anokijig =

Youth summer camp in Plymouth, Wisconsin, United States

Coordinates: 43.807844°N 87.972733°W

Camp Anokijig is a residential youth summer camp located in Plymouth, Wisconsin on Little Elkhart Lake. Founded in 1926 by the Racine YMCA, Camp Anokijig is now independently owned and operated by the non-profit group Friends of Camp Anokijig, and operates year-round. Camp Anokijig is accredited by the American Camping Association.

The camp's mission is to provide youth and families with an outdoor setting and community dedicated to the development of positive lifestyles, while learning new skills, experiencing personal growth, having fun, and developing an appreciation for the natural environment.

== Location ==
Camp Anokijig is located four miles north of Plymouth, Wisconsin and one hour north of Milwaukee. Situated on Little Elkhart Lake, within Wisconsin's Kettle Moraine forests, Camp Anokijig consists of 356 1/2 acres of forest, wetland, and lakefront.

== History ==
The Racine YMCA founded Camp Anokijig in 1926. In May 1926, Ray Vance, then Youth Director of the Racine YMCA, and Adolph Gillund rented 20 acres of land on Little Elkhart Lake from local farmer Mike Hecker. The following summer, 40 acres of land were purchased from Hecker for $8000, and camp development began with the construction of Optimist Mess Hall. Anokijig initially offered residential summer camp programs for boys of southeastern Wisconsin and northern Illinois where campers could participate in swimming, archery, trail crafts, and boating. In 1940, Anokijig began offering co-ed camping. Anokijig is supported by numerous dedicated volunteers and the community. Anokijig is a Native American word meaning "we serve."

In 2005, the Racine YMCA opted to sell Camp Anokijig. A group of concerned and dedicated camp alumni formed a 501(c)(3) non-profit corporation, the Friends of Camp Anokijig, and secured financing to purchase the camp. Today Camp Anokijig operates as an independent youth and family camp, serving over 10,000 campers and visitors per year.

== Facilities ==
The 356 acres of Camp Anokijig house numerous structures for year-round and seasonal use.

- Western Lodge, completed in 1949, is one of the largest log structures in the state of Wisconsin and serves as the camp's dining hall and meeting space.
- R.C. Vance Nature Center, originally the Chester Beach Memorial Trading Post and one of Camp Anokijig’s oldest structures, houses nature education exhibits.
- Trading Post (camp store)
- Foxwell Lodge houses arts and crafts and outdoor education laboratory space.
- Boathouse
- Corral
- Health Lodge
- Cabins: Voigt Lodge, Myer’s Lodge, MASH, Lakeview, Eastman Lodge, Thunderbird, Stone Road, Crows Nest
- Tent Sections: Rippling Ridge, Kingdom of Moo, Turtle Island, Hickory Hillcrest, Timberline, Brave Village
- Tuttle Chapel
- Archery Range
- Rifle Range

== Programs ==
=== Resident summer camp ===
The summer camp season at Anokijig operates from mid-June to mid-August. Serving boys and girls ages 7 to 16, campers can choose to stay anywhere from four days to all nine weeks of the season.

Camp Anokijig‘s resident camp allows campers to choose from activities including: horseback riding, swimming, arts and crafts, fishing, canoeing, sailing, archery, windsurfing, hiking, kayaking, woodworking, ukulele band, dance, drama, pellet gun, nature, and outdoor games. Older campers can also choose from day trips including paint ball, high ropes challenge course, fishing, Noah’s Ark Water Park, rock climbing, whitewater rafting, and spelunking.

Through contributions from alumni and donors Camp Anokijig is also able to provide scholarships for its summer camp programs.

=== Specialty camps ===
Specialty camps combine all of the activities of Anokijig’s resident camp program with an additional focus on a particular activity for part of the day. Specialty camp programs include: Horsemanship - Ranch (7th grade and above) and Circle A (4th grade and above), Competitive Swim, Fishing Expedition (4th grade and above), and Adventure Challenge (8th grade and above). Anokijig also offers adventure trips where campers and staff travel outside of camp for whitewater rafting, sea kayaking on Lake Superior, and rock climbing.

=== School groups ===
Before and after the summer camp season, Camp Anokijig also offers outdoor education programs for 5th to 8th grade students. Activities include outdoor survival, wetland studies, animal adaptations, orienteering, shelter building, canoeing, low ropes course challenges, archery, fishing, glacial geology, and forestry.

=== Group and weekend rentals ===
Anokijig’s facilities are available for general rental ranging from partial day rental to several day stays, and are available to school groups, colleges, universities, churches, businesses, and corporate groups.

=== Family camp ===
Camp Anokijig offers four family camp weekends in the spring and fall - Memorial Day, weekends in late August, Labor Day, and a Fall Colors weekend including lodging, meals, and use of camp program equipment. Horseback riding and arts and crafts are also available for an additional fee.

== Staff ==
Nine full-time staff members operate Anokijig year-round. During the summer over 30 Senior Staff (age 18 and over) and 100 Junior Staff (high school age) counselors join the year-round staff, making for a four-to-one camper to staff ratio. A majority of senior staff members are trained in lifeguarding and CPR/First Aid. A medical staffer is present 24 hours a day.
