= Vision Tech Camps =

Bay Area Company

- Company type: Private
- Industry: Summer camp
- Founded: San Ramon, California, United States
- Founder: Anita Khurana
- Headquarters: Danville, California, United States
- Website: www.visiontechcamps.com

Vision Tech Camps is a Bay Area company offering summer computer camps and after-school activities, teaching students between the ages of 7 and 17 at Vision Tech centers and local schools throughout the Bay Area.

== History ==
Vision Tech Camps was founded in San Ramon, California by Anita Khurana in 2000, where after school programs and tech camps were initially offered to schools at schools within the San Ramon Valley Unified School District. Vision Tech later opened its first center in Danville, California, and expanded to another center in Saratoga, California in 2014. In 2017, Vision Tech Camps announced a new location in El Cerrito, California serving the Berkeley area.

== Courses ==
Vision Tech courses include video game design, programming, engineering, robotics, minecraft camps and 3d printing.
