= Camp El Tesoro =

Multi-use camp in Granbury, Texas, US

Coordinates: 32.3941°N 97.6532°W

Camp Fire Camp El Tesoro
- Other names: ET
- Motto: Where kids explore, laugh and grow
- Type: Overnight Camps
- Established: 1934
- Affiliations: Camp Fire, Camp Fire First Texas, American Camp Association
- Location: Granbury, Texas, United States
- Campus: 228 acres (0.92 km^{2})
- Website: www.campeltesoro.org

Camp Fire Camp El Tesoro is a 223-acre (0.90 km^{2}) year-round multi-use camp established in 1934 and accredited by the American Camp Association. It is located in Granbury, Texas, southwest of Fort Worth.

Camp El Tesoro offers year-round family camping, spring break events, group retreats and outdoor education for students. During the summer El Tesoro offers traditional overnight camp, day camp and a camp for grieving children.
