= Calvin Crest =

American private Christian campsite

Calvin Crest Conferences
- Formation: 1954; 72 years ago
- Purpose: Worship and religious studies
- Location: 45800 Calvin Crest Rd, Oakhurst, CA
- Coordinates: 37.417156°N 119.603631°W
- Website: https://www.calvincrest.com/

Calvin Crest or Calvin Crest Conferences is a private Christian campsite near Oakhurst, California, US. Calvin Crest was established by the San Joaquin Presbytery of California in 1954.

== History ==
The Miwok Indians were the first peoples to inhabit the Calvin Crest grounds. Staying during the summer months and migrating to the foothills and valley during the winter months.

In 1873, the California Lumber Company began operations in the region and constructed a flume to send lumber to the growing city of Madera, California. Completed in 1876, the flume was 53 miles (85 km) in length. By 1907, 35 million board feet (83,000 m^{3}) were shipped annually. During the Great Depression of the 1930s, much of the timber industry in California shut down. Remnants of the industry can be found in the old narrow gauge railroad ties and the stumps of the giant sequoia that were left behind.

Hills Speckerman, a German immigrant, settled the Calvin Crest area. His first cabin was located by the current maintenance parking lot where he planted the first apple trees, grew potatoes and bred pigs and dogs. After his cabin burned to the ground, he moved to the area known as Speckerman's Meadow. Following his death in 1909 at the approximate age of 90 years, the land reverted to the government for back taxes.

John Nelder, a hermit living in the area among the giant sequoia, was visited by the naturalist, John Muir in what is now Nelder Grove which sits adjacent to Calvin Crest.

A man named Darnold owned the property after Speckerman and he built the original Ranch House. Later, Dr. Clarence Wells homesteaded 40 acres (160,000 m^{2}) and then traded for an additional 300 acres (1.2 km^{2}). Working as a physician to the lumber companies, Dr. Wells expanded the Ranch as well as enlarged the apple orchard and planted roses and other exotic plants.

In the early fifties, the San Joaquin Presbytery began looking for a property to purchase to establish a camping program. They had been renting the YMCA camp at Lake Sequoia. After some searching, they learned the property of Dr. Wells was for sale. The presbytery voted to purchase the 340 acres (1.4 km^{2}) in December 1954 with the price tag of $86,000. The summer of 1955 brought the first campers to Calvin Crest. There were two one-week sessions where the campers slept on the ground in the apple orchard and swam in Bass Lake. There were 65 campers and the annual budget was $25.

In 1956, the first major building phase began when construction started on the Dining Hall and the swimming pool.

== Camping programs ==
Calvin Crest designs and hosts Christian camping programs throughout the summer season. Programs are designed for third grade students through recent high-school graduates, as well as family camping programs. Calvin Crest offers High School Camp, Junior High Camp, Sherwood Camp (Third- Fifth Graders), Outdoor Adventure, AIM (Assistants in Mission), and Week in the Forest. Each program is organized and run by the Calvin Crest Summer Staff.

Among several recreational activities, Calvin Crest offers: boating, hiking, swimming, fishing, rock climbing, arts and crafts, and a ropes course.

From September to the late Spring, Calvin Crest hosts an Outdoor education program designed and taught by the Calvin Crest Outdoor Education staff. These programs are designed for fifth or sixth grade students.

During Fall to spring, Calvin Crest also offers programs for Women's Retreat, Men's Camp, Winter Camp, and Crest Fest. The men's and women's retreats are designed specifically for male and female adults. Winter camp is designed for teenagers between Middle school and Highschool. Crest fest is a yearly event that starts October 29, and offers activities such as: Live Music, Hayrides, Local Vendors, Crafting, Chili cook-offs, Homemade pie auction, craft workshop, and more. This is a free to attend activity, with opportunities to donate to Calvin Crest.
