= Camp Seymour =

YMCA camping facility in Washington, US

Coordinates: 47.344646°N 122.730761°W

Camp Seymour is a YMCA camping facility located in Washington state. It is considered a branch of the YMCA of Pierce and Kitsap Counties and has been in operation since 1907. As of 2019, it frequently sold out and a sister camp at Lake Helena was established. In 2005, YMCA Camp Seymour celebrated its 100th anniversary with events for the community, friends, family and alumni. YMCA Camp Seymour is one of only five YMCA camps in the nation to celebrate 100 years of camping on its original property.
