= Skyhawks Sports Academy =

Youth sports camp in Spokane, Washington, USA

- Industry: Youth Sports
- Founded: 1979
- Headquarters: Spokane, Washington, United States
- Number of locations: Programming available nationwide
- Key people: Jason Frazier (President) / (COO); Josh Kaiel (VP of Franchise)
- Products: Baseball; Basketball; Cheerleading; Flag Football; Golf; Lacrosse; Multi-Sport; Soccer; Tennis; Track & Field; Volleyball
- Website: www.skyhawks.com

Skyhawks Sports Academy is a youth sports camp organization based in Spokane, Washington, United States. The organization was founded in Spokane in 1979 as a soccer program where children could learn sports in a fun, safe and non-competitive environment. Skyhawks now offer programs in more than 11 different sports for children ages 4–14 across North America. The format includes week-long summer camps, clinics, and year-round after-school programs that range from 45 minutes to 6 hours, per day.

== History ==
=== Public-private partnerships ===
Skyhawks Sports offers sports camps through public-private partnerships. Partnerships with Skyhawks Sports have been made with city recreation departments, youth sport organizations, youth soccer clubs, YMCAs, boys and girls clubs, school districts, and religious institutions.

=== 1980s ===
In 1980, Skyhawks Sports Academy offered its first soccer camp in partnership with Spokane Youth Sports Association. Throughout the 1980s Skyhawks Sports Academy offered soccer camps throughout the Pacific Northwest (Washington, Idaho, Montana and Oregon).

=== 1990s ===
In the 1990s Skyhawks Sports Academy expanded its operations to include California, Texas, Utah, Wyoming, Colorado, Massachusetts, Connecticut, New Jersey and Minnesota. In 1991 Skyhawks Sports Academy created its Mini-Hawk program, which combined soccer, baseball and basketball for children between the ages of four and seven. Skyhawks Sports also added roller hockey, golf, and flag football. After-school programs, a Skyhawks Sport Academy website and online camper registration process were also added to Skyhawks Sports Academy in the 1990s.

=== 2000s ===
In the 2000s Skyhawks Sports introduced tennis, volleyball, cheerleading, skateboarding, and track and field. Skyhawks Sports expanded into New Hampshire, Maine, Rhode Island, New York, Pennsylvania, Illinois, Wisconsin, Ohio, Indiana and Missouri.

=== 2010s ===
Skyhawks acquires popular young child sports company SoccerTots. Under Skyhawks SoccerTots becomes SuperTots Sports Academy and expands its sport offerings creating a single company for sport education for children ages 18 months through 14 years.

== Camps and programs ==
=== Progressive curriculum ===
The company applies a five-step curriculum for children, who are grouped by age:

- Introduce
  - For children ages 3–5- Introduce the active lifestyle. First steps towards fitness and sports
- Discover
  - For children ages 4–6- Discover sports. Concentrates on children’s attainments and self-discovery
- Develop
  - For children ages 6–8- Develop the love of the game. Increase skills and strength
- Refine
  - For children ages 6–12- Refining of skills. Advanced skills

=== Safety ===
Skyhawks most well-known safety measure is the “Gate System and Parking Lot Duty.” Coaches greet parents and campers in the parking lot on arrival, and guide them via a check-in/check-out gate system into the field or court.

=== Sports ===
- Soccer
- Basketball
- Flag Football
- Baseball
- Volleyball
- Golf
- Cheerleading
- Multi-Sport
- Tennis
- Track and Field
- Lacrosse

=== Staff ===
Skyhawks coaches' and site directors' job is to emphasize teamwork and learning life skills through sports. All Skyhawks Sports staff complete a certification process that includes:

- Interview and tryout screening
  - Proof of strong athletic skills
  - Proof of being a great role model for kids and a minimum 3.0 GPA
- National background check
- CPR and first-aid certification
- Testing on and off the field or court
- Training and skill development workshops

== Franchising ==
Skyhawks Sports began offering franchising opportunities in 2007. Local franchisees can now own and operate their own Skyhawks Sports camp. The Skyhawks Sports Program includes marketing strategies and the technology to manage events, marketing, and staff—all of these are included in the Confidential Operations Manual.
