= US Sports Camps =

US Sports Camps, Inc. (“USSC”)
- Company type: Private
- Industry: Sports camp
- Founded: 1975
- Founder: Charlie Hoeveler
- Headquarters: San Rafael, California
- Key people: Bendan Doyle (President) Siera Lova (COO)
- Brands: NIKE Sports Camps
- Website: ussportscamps.com

US Sports Camps (USSC) is a youth sports camp operator headquartered in San Rafael, California. Established in 1975, the company has grown to become the largest sports camp network in the United States, operating over 6,000 camps annually. USSC is the licensed operator of Nike Sports Camps, providing programs that cater to young athletes seeking structured skill development.

== History ==
The company was founded in 1975 by Charlie Hoeveler and Bill Closs. Billie Jean King, her coach Dennis Van der Meer, and Closs provided the initial capital, though Closs bought out the other two partners within a year. Shortly after, Hoeveler gained major ownership interest.

In 2020, the company was acquired by Roark Capital, a private equity firm known for its investments in multi-location businesses.

== Camp structure ==
Children ages 7–18 attend one and two-week camps, receiving intensive training in a single sport. The camps focus on nearly two dozen sports. Most camps are held during the summer on college campuses.

Camp directors, usually head coaches from host colleges, remain in charge of the camp expenses, facility rentals, and the hiring of camp staff. The directors receive incentive-based compensation. USSC handles marketing and administration of the camps.

== Leadership ==
Following the Roark Capital acquisition, Justin Hoeveler, Charlie Hoeveler’s son, was promoted to CEO. In 2023, Brendan Doyle, a sports industry veteran, was appointed President of US Sports Camps.

== Sponsorship ==
After carrying Adidas sponsorship during its early years, the company switched to Nike sponsorship in 1994. US Sports Camps is the official and exclusive operator of Nike Sports Camps, a relationship that has spanned more than 30 years.

Through this licensing agreement, USSC offers Nike-branded camps in over 15 sports, including basketball, soccer, tennis, baseball, swimming, and esports. Nike provides clothing and equipment for the camps, while USSC retains ownership and management of the camps.

== Camp Expansion ==
Since its founding with 150 tennis campers, US Sports Camps has expanded significantly. By 1986, it was serving over 2,000 participants annually. In 2013, the company surpassed 500,000 cumulative campers, and in 2019, hosted over 100,000 in a single year for the first time.

The organization has also grown through strategic acquisitions and partnerships. These include:

- The acquisition of U.S. Baseball Academy and U.S. Softball Academy in 2021, expanding its offerings in year-round baseball and softball instruction.
- The acquisition of CMT Learning in 2024, the UK-based operator of Euro Sports Camps and Nike Sports Camps UK.
- A partnership with Sports Camps Canada and a multi-year collaboration with Nintendo to incorporate interactive gaming experiences.
- The acquisition of KE Camps, which operates seasonal youth camps at private country clubs.

== Advertising and revenue ==
During 2015 more than 75,000 US and international campers attended a USSC program. As of 2012, annual revenues were near $30 million. Advertising techniques the company uses include ads in youth and sports-specific publications as well as major newspapers in addition to targeted direct-mail campaigns.

In 1998 USSC invested $80,000 to create an interactive website, allowing for online camp registration. The site garnered over a million dollars in revenue in one year. It led to a 20 percent increase in business with 20 percent lower office staffing requirements.

== Recognition ==
By 2013, US Sports Camps had served over 500,000 campers since its inception. In 2019, it exceeded 100,000 campers in a single year.

== See also ==
- Nike, Inc.
- Youth Enrichment Brands
- Summer camp
- Sports in the United States
