= Counselor-in-training =

Training program intended to prepare people to become counselors

Counselor-in-training (CIT) at a summer camp can be both a person's designation and a program intended to prepare people to become counselors. CIT programs vary in detail, but all have elements in common.

== Common elements ==
- Virtually all programs require familiarity with the normal activities that participants engage in by attending at least one session as a participant prior to becoming a CIT.
- If that is impossible or impractical, a training course may be held with the CITs acting as participants under the supervision of a CIT Trainer, who takes the "students" through the normal camp routines while demonstrating and discussing effective leadership techniques/skills in communication, group management, decision-making, and conflict management.
- The duration of the training may be as short as a weekend, several weeks, or an entire summer.
- After formal training, many programs require CITs to be assigned for a time period to an experienced counselor to assist and learn during sessions with campers. In other programs, the CITs stay together as a unit but are assigned during the day to help other camp staff, assist with special events, and participate in a service project.
- The CIT is evaluated by his trainer(s) and peers based on attitude, communication, values & character, program support, team building, and leadership style.
- Camps for older teens may allow regular attendees to follow a CIT apprenticeship curriculum by taking on extra responsibilities in exchange for benefits and privileges. They may or may not receive discounted tuition.
- Overnight camps may be subject to state law which requires counselors to be legal adults when supervising minors. Where that requirement exists, CITs are usually 16 or 17 years old, and junior CITs are 14 or 15. If a person is still under the legal age after successfully completing the CIT program, a camp may hire them as a Junior Counselor for specific duties.
- For Day camps, some organizations have Junior CIT programs for 12–13 year olds. and CIT programs after age 13.

== In popular culture ==
Courtney, a character in the popular Canadian animated reality comedy, Total Drama, is known to frequently mention her time as a CIT, much to the ire of other contestants.

== See also ==
- Camping (recreational activity)
- Outdoor education
- List of summer camps
- Wikibooks: How to be a Good Camp Counselor
