= Raffi Freedman-Gurspan =

American transgender rights activist (born 1987)

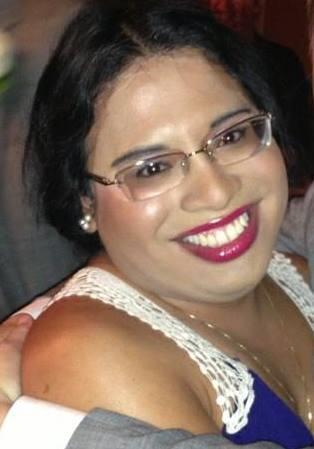
- Freedman-Gurspan in 2014
- Born: May 3, 1987 (age 39); Intibuca, Honduras
- Education: St. Olaf College (BA)
- Occupation: Activist Policy Advocate Political Appointee
- Employers: National Center for Transgender Equality (2014–2015, 2017–2019); White House (2015–2017); All on the Line (2019–2021); US Department of Transportation (2022–2025); Commonwealth of Massachusetts, Executive Office for Administration & Finance (2025-Present)
- Known for: Transgender rights activism

Raffi Freedman-Gurspan (born May 3, 1987) is a Honduran American transgender rights activist and the first openly transgender person to work as a White House staffer. She was also the first openly transgender legislative staffer to work in the Massachusetts House of Representatives. She served as director of external relations at the National Center for Transgender Equality, based in Washington, D.C. She is a longtime advocate and public policy specialist on matters concerning human rights, gender, and LGBT people.

== Early life and education ==
Freedman-Gurspan was born to a Lenca family living in Intibucá, Honduras on May 3, 1987. The Lenca are the indigenous people of western Honduras and eastern El Salvador. Unable to be raised by her birth family, she was adopted as an infant by an American Jewish couple and raised in Brookline, Massachusetts, where she attended the Edward Devotion School and Brookline High School. She said of her Jewish education in 2016: "My Jewish identity and family played an enormous role in shaping the individual I am today...Embracing diversity and understanding different perspectives was...a value I learned through Judaism...I believe this progressive Jewish upbringing, both at synagogue and at home, deeply impacted the path I took to work on public policy matters that affect the neediest in our society."

As a teenager, she developed an interest in Norway and Scandinavia, and went to Skogfjorden, a Norwegian language immersion summer camp in Bemidji, Minnesota run by the Concordia Language Villages. She self-identifies as Lenca and as Jewish.

Freedman-Gurspan received her Bachelor of Arts in political science and Norwegian with a Concentration in Nordic Studies from St. Olaf College in Northfield, Minnesota in 2009. During her junior year, she studied abroad at the University of Oslo Faculty of Law where she took classes in international law with a focus on human rights and gender equality. She is a proficient Norwegian speaker.

== Political career ==
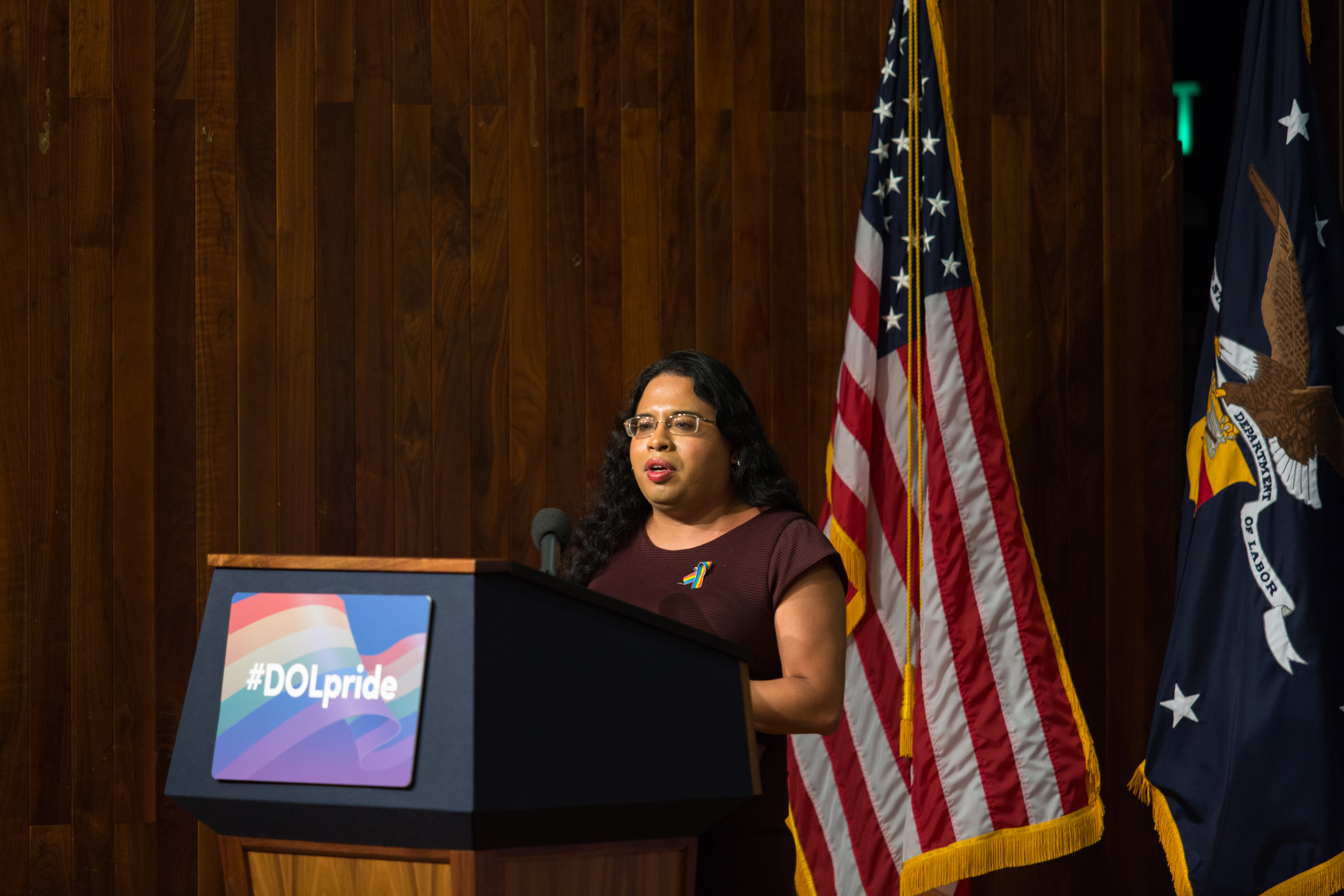
Freedman-Gurspan on June 28, 2016, at the Department of Labor.

After graduating from university in 2009, Freedman-Gurspan joined the Massachusetts Transgender Political Coalition (MTPC), where she worked on legislative and policy issues. Starting in May 2009, she worked as a Course and Research Assistant for Boston University's Women's, Gender, and Sexuality Studies Program. In January 2010, she was hired by Mayor Joseph A. Curtatone of Somerville, Massachusetts to serve as the city's LGBT liaison. Through her work with the MTPC and as Somerville LGBT Liaison she met then-Massachusetts State Representative Carl Sciortino, a Medford Democrat. At the time he was one of the lead sponsors on a bill in the state legislature that would expand state civil rights protections to transgender residents.

In July 2011, Freedman-Gurspan join Sciortino's office as a legislative aide, becoming the first openly transgender legislative staffer in the Massachusetts State House. She played an instrumental role in helping Sciortino pass the transgender civil rights bill in November 2011, which was signed into law by then-Governor Deval Patrick in January 2012. Freedman-Gurspan worked as Sciortino's legislative director until he retired from the Massachusetts House of Representatives in the spring of 2014.

In July 2014, Freedman-Gurspan was hired as policy advisor at the National Center for Transgender Equality (NCTE) and moved to Washington, DC. There her work focused on issues facing transgender people of color and those living in poverty. Her work included criminal justice and incarceration reform, immigration detention conditions, housing and homeless shelter policies, and sustainable economic development opportunities for transgender people in the United States.

On August 18, 2015, Freedman-Gurspan was hired by President Barack Obama as Outreach and Recruitment Director in the Presidential Personnel Office at the White House, becoming the first openly transgender person to work as a White House staffer. He subsequently appointed her as the White House's primary LGBT liaison in 2016, making her the first openly transgender person in the role. She served in this role until January 6, 2017. On January 17, 2017, President Obama appointed her to a 5-year term as a member of the United States Holocaust Memorial Council, the Board of Trustees of the United States Holocaust Museum in Washington, DC.

On April 3, 2017, Freedman-Gurspan rejoined the National Center for Transgender Equality as its new director of external relations. In this role she led and enhanced NCTE's organizing and public education efforts, and supported the organization's policy and communications programs.

In May 2019, Freedman-Gurspan left NCTE to become Deputy Campaign Director for the All on the Line Campaign, a project with a mission to end gerrymandering.

In January 2022, Freedman-Gurspan was appointed by President Joe Biden to deputy director of Public Engagement at the U.S. Department of Transportation, where she worked on behalf of U.S. Secretary of Transportation Pete Buttigeig.

After nearly 11 years living in Washington, DC, in May 2025 Freedman-Gurspan returned to Boston and began working for Commonwealth of Massachusetts, Executive Office for Administration & Finance in the Federal Funds and Infrastructure Office as an Associate Director. She is an appointee in Governor Maura Healey's administration.
