= Muhammad Shaaban (disambiguation) =

Muhammad Shaaban may refer to:

- Mohamed Shaaban, Egpytian footballer
- Mohammed Shaaban, Qatari footballer
- Muhammad Shaaban, Egpytian diplomat
