= Al-Waha =

Language school in Lebanon

Al-Wāḥa (الواحة, "The Oasis") is an immersion-based Arabic-language camp for students between the ages of 7 and 18 associated with Concordia Language Villages. It was established in 2006 with the help from a grant from the U.S. State Department but maintains no lasting connection with the United States government.

== Daily life ==
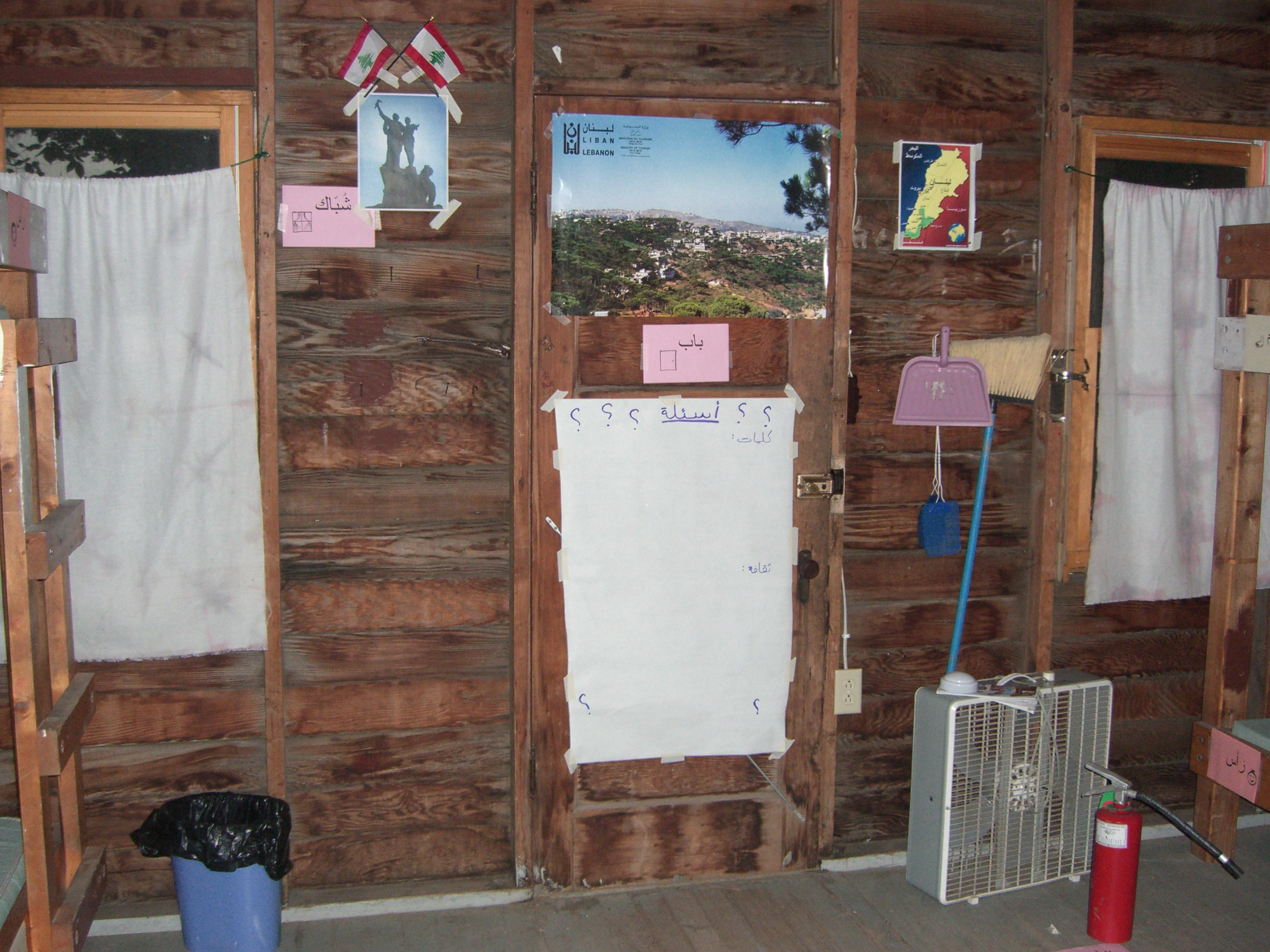
Inside of the Beirut, Lebanon cabin at Camp Trowbridge (Vergas, Minnesota).

At Al-Wāḥa, Arabic language and culture are taught through Arabic games, arts and crafts, dances, sports, songs, and culturally authentic foods. Each day is focused around a theme, which include countries, holidays, literature, and art. Additionally, all daily activities are named in the Arabic language and all signs are given in the Arabic script.

Al-Waha provides instruction to children of all ages through a variety of sessions. Single-week programs are designed for school groups, two separate two-week programs focus on younger villagers and then older villagers in turn, and a four-week credit program for high school students immerses them even in more rigorous classes. Credit villagers spend as many hours learning Arabic in a month through the immersion settings (classroom time, activities conducted in the language, meals and more) as they would in a full school year of study. The site also offers a day camp for younger learners; this is a week in which children arrive mid-morning to participate in activities with the other villagers.

== Modern Standard Arabic and dialects at Al-Wāḥa ==
The main language used in the camp is Modern Standard Arabic, a formal standard literary variety of Arabic. Due to the diglossic situation in the Arab world, this variety of Arabic is rarely used in informal situations outside the camp. To expose students to Arabic dialects, the camp performs skits and sing in dialects. Additionally, dialect speakers often intermingle their native dialects with Modern Standard Arabic. Counselors and students who are heritage speakers come from countries such as Egypt, Sudan and Lebanon, in addition to the United States, which exposes all students to new dialects.

== Locations ==
Al-Wāḥa originally started at Camp Trowbridge, a Camp Fire owned summer camp located along Trowbridge Lake in Otter Tail County near Vergas, Minnesota. Camp Trowbridge had previously been used by Waldsee, the German language camp and Lesnoe Ozero, the Russian language camp. The camp property officially closed in 2011 and the site has since been razed for lake homes.

In 2010, the Al-Wāḥa relocated to Turtle River Lake in Bemidji at the site of the Norwegian camp Skogfjorden.

== Relation to United States State Department ==
Preparations for Al-Wāḥa began a year and a half before its opening, with the help of national prominent experts in the Arabic language. Its curriculum was being developed independently before receiving a $250,000 grant from the U.S. State Department to fund the camp. This grant, part of the National Security Language Initiative, is the first grant that Concordia Language Villages has received for its villages. A spokesperson for the State Department's Bureau of Educational and Cultural Affairs noted that the government does not plan to track students who attend al-Wāḥa.

== Qatar Foundation International (QFI) ==
Concordia Language Villages’ Arabic program, Al-Wāḥa, has benefitted from strategic partnerships with Qatar Foundation International (QFI) and STARTALK, both of which support the promotion and expansion of Arabic language education in the United States. QFI has provided financial and programmatic support to Al-Wāḥa, helping to increase access to immersive Arabic learning experiences for students from diverse backgrounds. Similarly, STARTALK, a federally funded initiative through the National Security Language Initiative, has partnered with Al-Wāḥa to enhance the quality of Arabic language instruction and teacher training, aligning with national goals of increasing Arabic language proficiency among U.S. students. These collaborations have strengthened Al-Wāḥa’s curriculum, expanded scholarship opportunities, and enabled the camp to offer a more robust and culturally authentic immersion experience.
