= German Free School =

Historic building in Austin, Texas

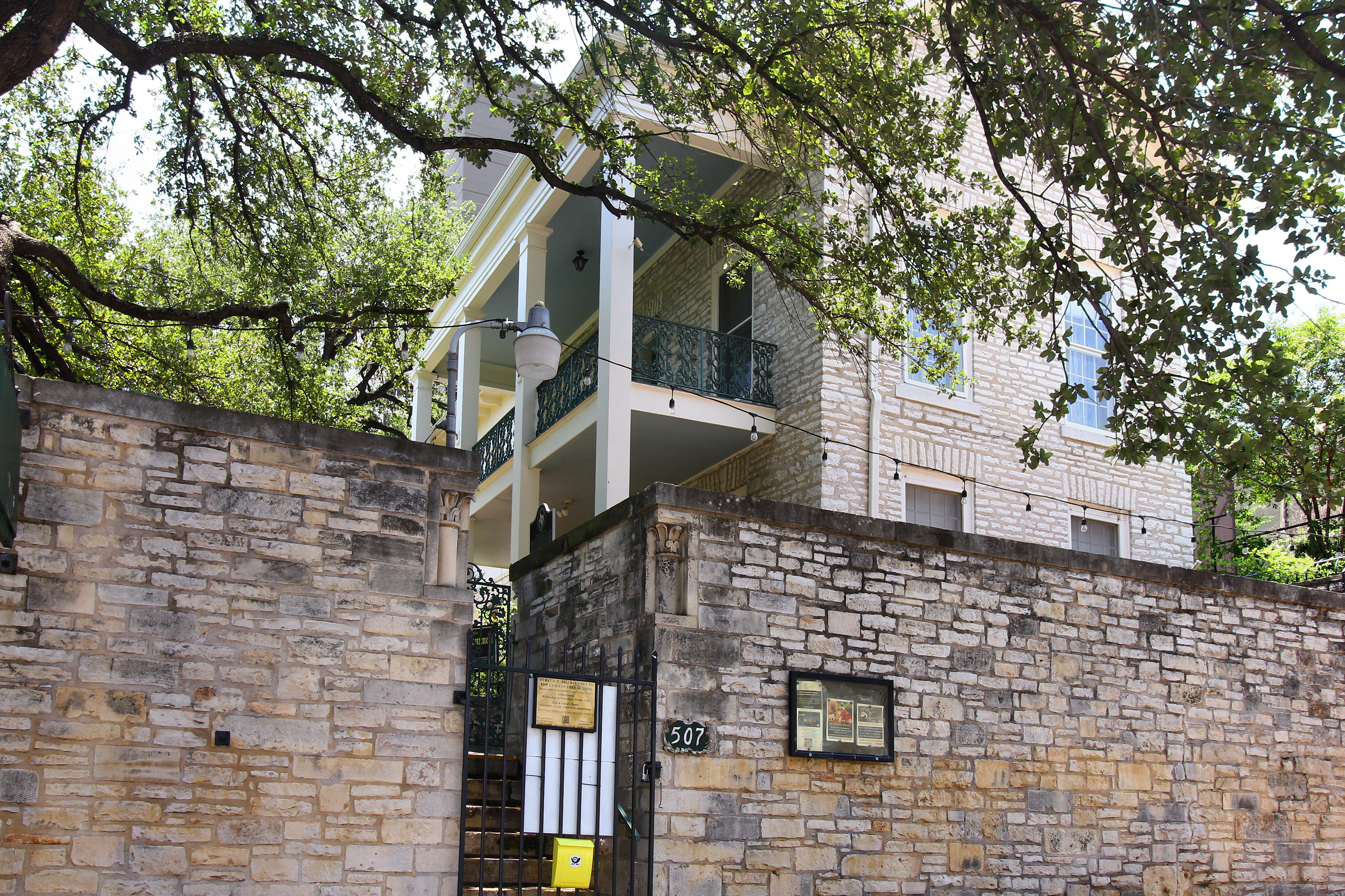
- The German Free School building in downtown Austin

- Location within Texas
- 30.2700852°N 97.7389562°W
- Location: 507 E. 10th Street; Austin, TX

History
- Built: 1852

Recorded Texas Historic Landmark
- Designated: 1962
- Reference no.: 5453012732

The German Free School is a historic building located at 507 East 10th Street in Austin, Texas. Built in 1857 with funds donated by local German-Texan notable William von Rosenberg, the structure was home to the German Free School Association, the first Austin school chartered by the Texas Legislature upon its opening in 1858. The site was designated as a City of Austin Historic Landmark in 1956 and a Recorded Texas Historic Landmark in 1962.

== History ==
Established in 1858 by German immigrants in Texas, the German Free School operated as a secular school for students regardless of background until the 1881 founding of Austin's public school system. The building, located at what is now 507 East 10th street in downtown Austin, was expanded around 1872 and damaged in a 1919 fire.

In 1948, the artist Kelly Stevens purchased the building, which he owned as a private residence until his death in 1991, at which point he gifted the building to the German-Texan Heritage Society in his will, on the advice of his attorney, Rodney C. Koenig. The building has since served as the headquarters for the German-Texan Heritage Society, a non-profit organization that promotes German culture in Texas through initiatives such as festivals and German language classes.
