= Texas German language =

German dialects of south-central Texas

Texas German
- Texasdeutsch
- Native to: Texas
- Region: Texas German Country
- Ethnicity: Texas Germans
- Native speakers: 70,000 (1972)
- Language family: Indo-European: Germanic; West Germanic; Elbe Germanic; High German; Texas German

Language codes
- ISO 639-3: –
- Glottolog: None
- IETF: de-u-sd-ustx

Texas German (German: Texasdeutsch, pronounced [ˈtɛksasˌdɔʏtʃ]) is a group of German language dialects spoken by descendants of mid-19th century German settlers, Texas Germans. They settled the Texas German Country, running from Houston to the Hills Region, and founded the towns of Bulverde, New Braunfels, Fredericksburg, Boerne, Pflugerville, Walburg and Comfort in the Texas Hill Country; Muenster in North Texas; and Schulenburg, Brenham, Industry, New Ulm and Weimar in East Texas.

== History and documentation ==
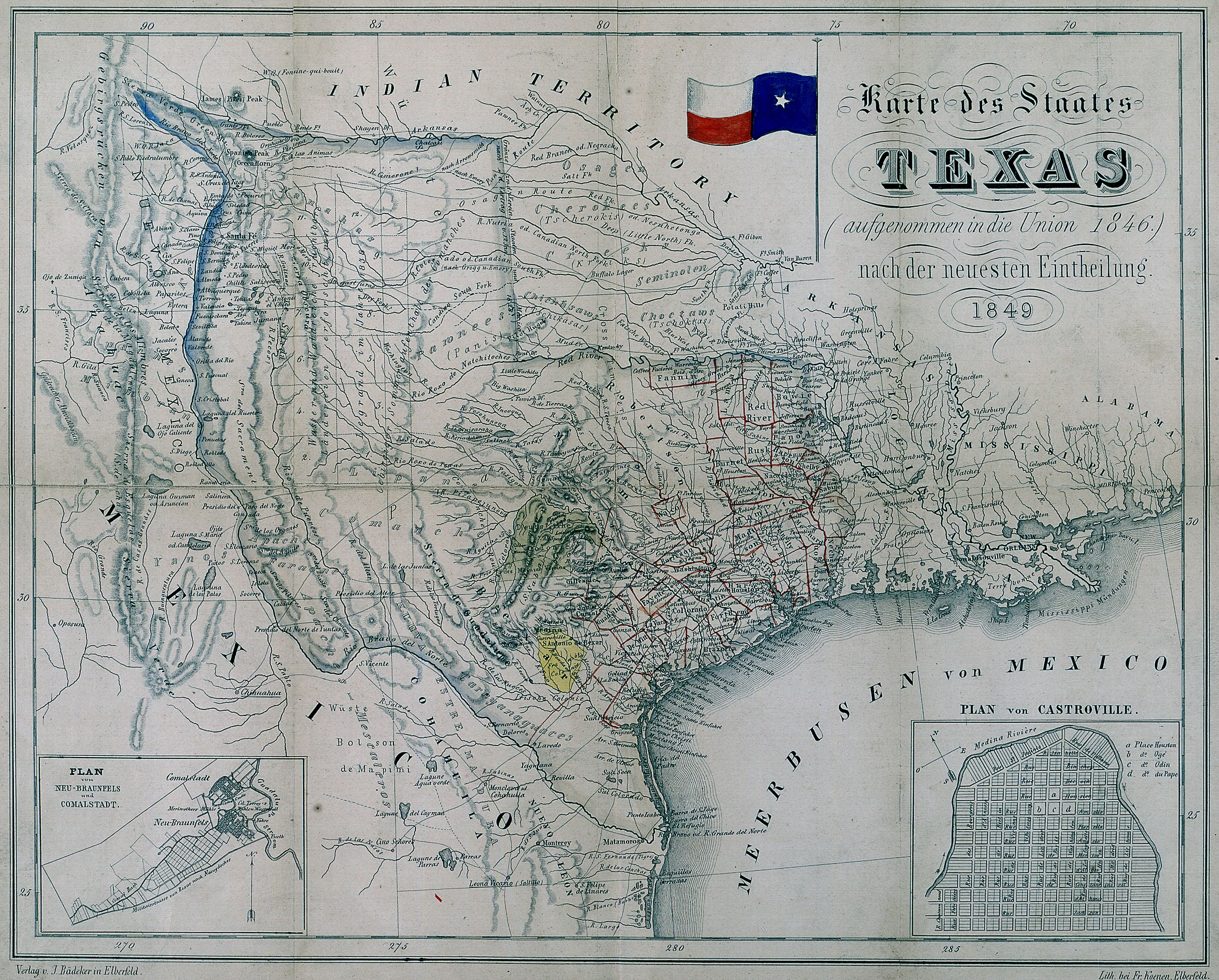
A Texas German map, Karte des Staates Texas

While most heritage languages in the United States die out by the third generation, Texas German is unusual in that most German Texans continued to speak German in their homes and communities for several generations after settling in the state. The State of Texas recognized German as having equal status to Spanish from 1846 up until World War I.

In 1907, there were approximately 90,000 (2.57% of the state's population) Texas German speakers in Texas, and by 1940, it increased to about 160,000 (2.49%). By the 1960s, only about 70,000 (0.73%) speakers remained. Today, there are estimated to be only about 5,000 (0.017%) speakers left, the vast majority of whom are in their 70s or older. Texas German is expected to die out by 2035.

Starting in 1893, Texas schools mandated English-only instruction, and required children to learn English in school regardless of what language they spoke at home. Due to the assimilation of these communities and strong anti-German sentiment during both World War I and World War II, Texas German speakers decided to stop transmitting the language to their children, and shifted towards speaking only English.

Currently, Hans Boas at the University of Texas is recording and studying the dialect, building on research originally performed by Glenn Gilbert of Southern Illinois University Carbondale in the 1960s.

It's an odd mixture of English and 19th-century German," says Boas ... "Hardly any of the Texas Germans speak alike. There's a lot of variation in the dialect. Texas German borrows about 5 to 6 percent of its vocabulary from English.'

Boas' book on the language, The Life and Death of Texas German, describes the German dialects which may have been the source of the language spoken in Texas.

A short documentary project named "All Güt Things" was produced about Texas German in 2016.

An episode with the title "Texas German" was published on the podcast Yellow of the Egg in 2022, where Dr. Hans C. Boas (Director of the Texas German Dialect Project) was a guest.

== Distribution and population ==
The 2000 US Census was the last decennial census to publish detailed data on languages spoken at home. At the time, the Census found 2,270 German speakers in Gillespie County, 1,520 in Comal County, 1,225 in Guadalupe County and 464 in Kendall County. In Gillespie County, German speakers made up 11.51% of the population. In total, around 82,000 German speakers resided in Texas, including European German speakers. At the time, German was the fourth-most spoken language in the state, behind English, Spanish, and Vietnamese. The vast majority of German speakers were bilingual, with 95% reporting they could speak English "well" or "very well."

More recent data from the Census Bureau groups German into "Other Indo-European Languages," a much broader category that excludes Spanish and English. As such, it is hard to assess the number of current Texas German speakers. A decline is clearly present in at least Gillespie County, where the American Community Survey's 2024 5-year estimate tallied only 556 "Other Indo-European" speakers. Most of those speakers were over 65 years old and none were under 18. Even with large margins of error, the figure reflects a stark decline from the 2,270 speakers found in the 2000 Census.

== Comparisons with German and English ==
Texas German is adapted to U.S. measurement and legal terminologies. Standard American German words typically were invented, introduced from other German dialects of the region, or English loanwords were introduced for words not present in 19th-century German. Dialect leveling is also found throughout many of the American German dialects including Texas German. In some cases, these new words also exist in modern Standard German, but with a different meaning. For instance, the word Luftschiff (used for "airplane") means airship in Standard German.

The table below illustrates some examples of differences:

American English	Texas German	Literal translation	Standard German	Literal translation
skunk	Stinkkatze	stink cat	Stinktier	stink animal
armadillo	Panzerschwein	armored pig	Gürteltier	belt animal
airplane	Luftschiff	airship	Flugzeug	flight thing
blanket	Blanket	blanket (borrowing)	Decke	blanket, cover
gone	all	empty; gone	leer; alle	empty; used up
bucket	Kann	can	Eimer	bucket
fire place	Feuerplatz	fire place	Kamin	fireplace; chimney

== See also ==
- German Texan
- New Braunfels, Texas
- Czech Texan
- Pennsylvania German
- Hutterite German
- Plautdietsch
- German language in the United States

== Sources ==
- Boas, Hans C (2009). The Life and Death of Texas German. Publication of the American Dialect Society. Duke University Press. ISBN 9780822367161.
