= Lac du Bois (camp) =

French language camp in Minnesota

Lac du Bois ("Lake of the Woods" in French) is a French language and culture camp at the Concordia Language Villages based in Minnesota. As with the other Concordia Language Village programs, it is a language immersion program. The Lac du Bois experience is offered in Bemidji, MN. A second site, Voyageurs (camp), provides similar language learning with a different curriculum and structure. All Concordia Language Villages programs are accredited by the American Camp Association.

== Facilities ==
Entertainment at Lac du Bois.

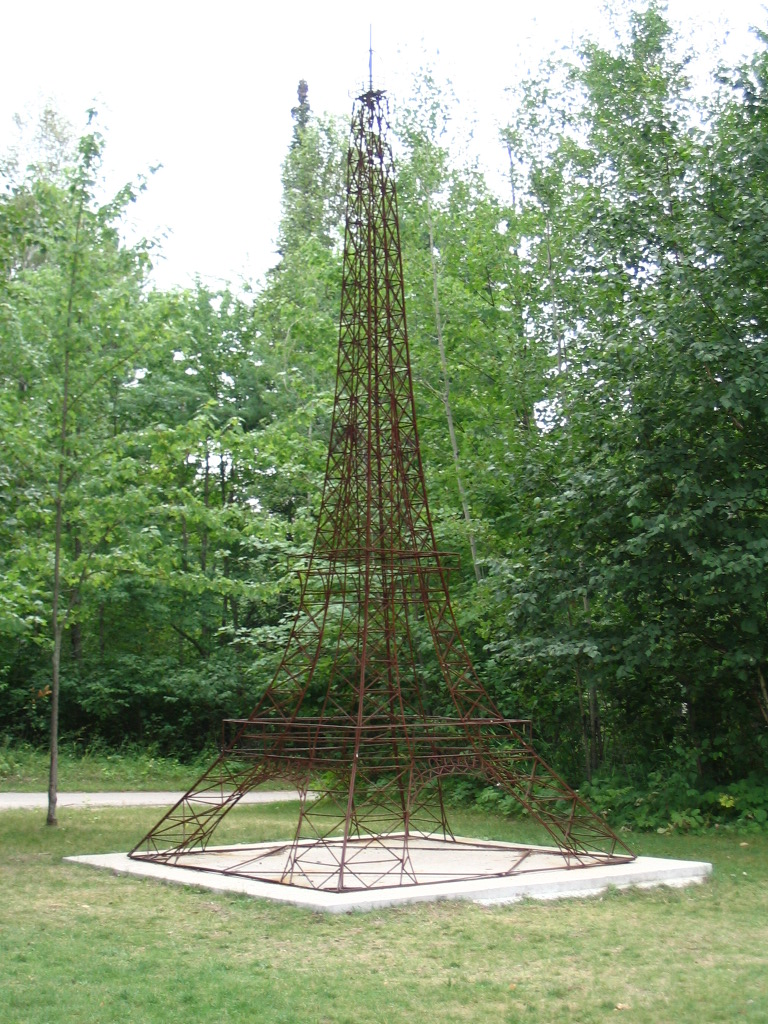
Lac du Bois Bemidji has a to-scale model of the Eiffel Tower.

The Lac du Bois site is located on Turtle River Lake with several other Language Villages (Skogfjorden, Salolampi, El Lago del Bosque, Lesnoe Ozero, Waldsee) near Bemidji, Minnesota. The site features French style architecture, including three sets of cabins that reflect the regional architecture of Corse, Bretagne and Provence.

At the center of each of the main regions lies a main building, flanked on each corner by a cabin. The main buildings, called Le marché ("The market") and La grange ("The barn") respectively, each contain showers, sinks, and toilets, one large carpeted room upstairs, and a basement. The basement of La grange is called Beaux-Arts, an arts-and-crafts area where villagers do activities such as collage, making friendship bracelets, and painting.

There is also a regulation pétanque or boules court, and a small store that sells village-themed items such as t-shirts, French-language books, and stuffed animals. A counter located in the main foyer of the Paris building called "Sucré Coeur" (a pun on the Basilica of Sacré-Cœur, Paris) sells European candy and treats, and a pop-up café called Café Danièle sells both American and European sodas and beverages.

Lac du Bois has a lakefront beach on Turtle River Lake, with a dock painted with the flags of various Francophone countries and territories.

== See also ==
- Concordia Language Villages
