= German language in the United States =

American German
- US German
- Deutsch der Vereinigten Staaten
- Region: United States
- Ethnicity: German Americans; Austrian Americans; Swiss Americans; Liechtensteiner Americans; Belgian Americans; Luxembourgian Americans
- Native speakers: 858,682 (2023)
- Language family: Indo-European: Germanic; West Germanic; American German
- Writing system: Latin script (German alphabet); German Braille

Language codes
- ISO 639-3: –
- IETF: de-US

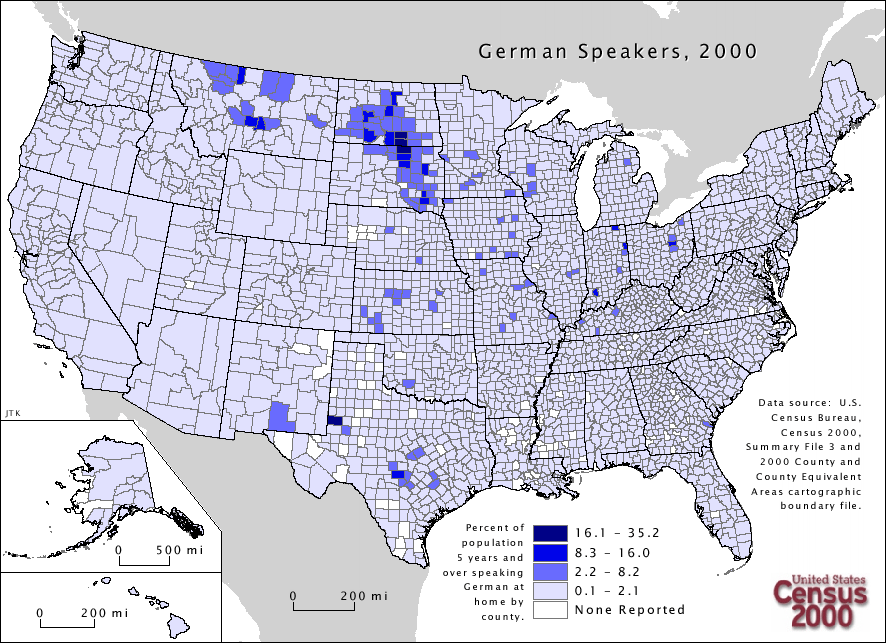
German language spread in the United States, 2000

Population of German speakers in the United States
Year	Speakers
1910^{a}	2,759,032
1920^{a}	▼2,267,128
1930^{a}	▼2,188,006
1940^{a}	▼1,589,048
1960^{a}	▼1,332,399
1970^{a}	▼1,201,535
1980	▲1,586,593
1990	▼1,547,987
2000	▼1,383,442
2023	▼858,682
^a Foreign-born population only

Over 50 million Americans claim German ancestry, which made them the largest single claimed ancestry group in the United States until 2020. As of 2023, 858,682 people in the United States speak the German language at home. It is the second most spoken language in North Dakota (1.39% of its population) and is the third most spoken language in 16 other states.

== History ==
Ever since the first ethnically German families settled in the United States in Jamestown, Virginia, in 1608, the German language, dialects, and different traditions of the regions of Germany have played a role in the social identity of many German-Americans.

By 1910, an account of 554 newspaper issues were being printed in the standard German language throughout the United States as well as several schools that taught in German with class time set aside for English language learning.

As a result of anti-German sentiment during World War I, the use of German declined. The daily use would recede in public view to primarily Amish, Old Order Mennonite and Hutterite communities.

=== German-language Methodist Church ===
Around 1800, two German-language Methodist churches were founded, the Vereinigten Brüder in Christo and the Evangelische Gemeinschaft. Both used Methodist hymnals in German and published German newspapers, of which one existed until 1937. From the middle of the 19th century, English was used as a second language in the churches, but there were regions in which German was the main church language into the 20th century. In 1937 both churches fused and joined the United Methodist Church in 1968.

=== German-language press ===
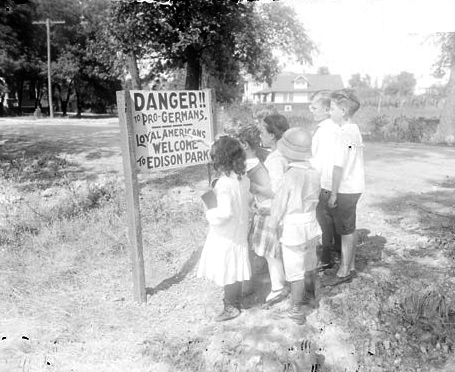
Anti-German sentiment obliterated the perspectives of German American citizens as being intellectuals, common folk, and prestige to being distrusted.

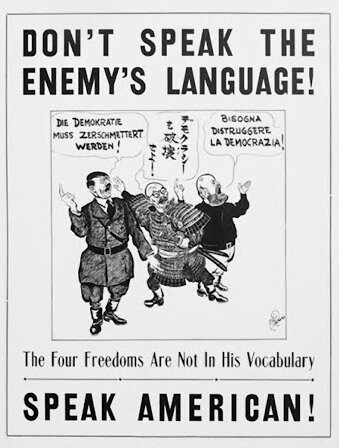
A 1940s-era poster discouraging the use of Italian, German, and Japanese

The first German newspaper in the U.S. was der Hochdeutsch-Pennsylvanische Geschicht-Schreiber, oder Sammlung Wichtiger Nachrichten aus dem Natur- und Kirchen-Reich ("the High German-Pennsylvanian story-writer, or collection of important news from the realms of nature and the church"), later known as die Germantauner Zeitung. It was a German-language paper, Der Pennsylvanische Staatsbote that on July 5, 1776, was the first paper to report the United States Declaration of Independence, and it did so in German translation. English readers would have to wait a day later to read the English text in The Pennsylvania Evening Post.

In the 19th century, the German press increased in importance and the number of dailies exploded. In 1909 a report stated "every American city or town with a large German population possesses one or more German newspapers. In New York City there are twelve or more... the best... being... the New Yorker Staats-Zeitung. The Illinois Staats-Zeitung has nearly as large a circulation, and the Milwaukee Germania claims the largest circulation of all. The Milwaukee Herold comes not far behind. Philadelphia has its Demokrat, Baltimore its Correspondent, Cincinnati its Volksblatt, St. Louis... its... Die Westliche Post, where Joseph Pulitzer started his career, and Der Anzeiger des Westens." It also reported that compared to 17,194 English papers in the U.S. in 1900, there were 613 German ones. The next largest language group, the Scandinavian, had only 115.

With the repression of the German language during World War I, the German press in America was reduced dramatically.

=== German language in public education ===
Throughout much of the 19th century, there were fierce debates in many large American metropolitan areas with German immigrant communities, such as Chicago and St. Louis to determine whether public schools should offer German-language education. The issue was of considerable local interest, as German-speaking families overwhelmingly sent their children to parochial schools at which instruction was conducted in German. In some German immigrant neighborhoods in Chicago, public school attendance was so low that the press reported the institutions as being practically empty. The decision of the Chicago Public Schools to make English the sole language of instruction in the city's schools sparked outrage from the city's German community. Hermann Raster, the Republican editor-in-chief of the Illinois Staats-Zeitung, and the Socialist politician Adolph Douai strongly opposed the new rule, and both became known as vocal critics of enforcing English-only education in the United States.

=== Persecution during World War I ===
When the U.S. joined in World War I, an anti-German hysteria quickly spread in American society. German-Americans, especially immigrants, were blamed for military acts of the German Empire, and even speaking German was seen as unpatriotic. Many German-American families anglicized their names (e.g. from Schmidt to Smith, Schneider to Taylor, Müller to Miller), and German nearly disappeared in public in many cities. In the countryside, the presence became quieter but persevered particularly in regions of many Germans. Many states otherwise forbade the use of German in public and the teaching of German in schools.

During the early 20th century, as influential White Anglo-Saxon Protestants in the United States sought to regain the upper hand of power and social influence, which had been heavily threatened by the waves of immigration, used politics and through the funded formation of the Ku Klux Klan, would help to give rise to anti-immigrant and distrust aimed at German-Americans among other groups of people. Through advertising and government-funded marketing, German-Americans also known as the "Dutchman," and the German language quickly went from being viewed as distinguished and the language of the educated to being distrusted, and as such, anyone fluent in the language regardless of age associated with or who practiced traditions viewed as foreign of any type was subject to several public harassments, distrust, and on a few occasions, death.

One such death of note was that of Robert Prager, a German seeking naturalization in St. Louis, Missouri, who was accused on the night of April 14, 1914, of being a German spy by a mob of 300 "men and boys" after he had allegedly shared words at a socialist meeting earlier that evening. The jail into which he had taken refuge from the crowds was quickly overrun and being stripped of his clothes, he was led down Main Street with a rope tied around his neck and was forced to walk the route. With shattered glass bottles being thrown down in his walking path, he was forced to sing patriotic songs. He was forced during this walk to kiss an American flag which had been wrapped around him. He was walked to a hanging tree at the edge of town where he was lynched. In an article from The St. Louis Global-Democrat, it was reported that there had been multiple incidences of mobs tarring and feathering individuals.

Other acts of discrimination based on ethnic background included the banning of performing of music from German composers at symphony concerts and attempts to rename certain foods. Sauerkraut for example would become Liberty Cabbage. "Hamburger" would be for a short while "Liberty Steaks."

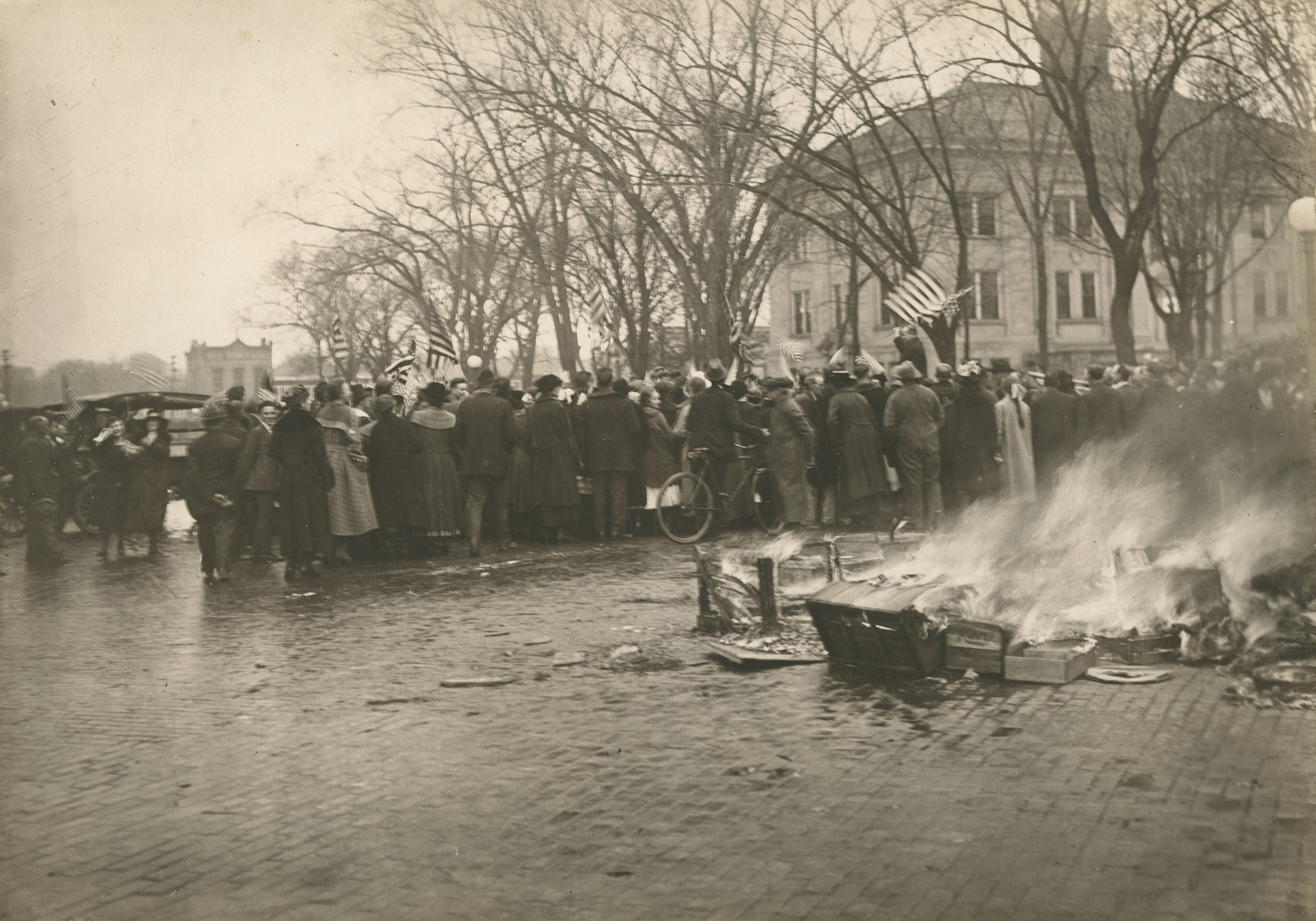
A pile of German textbooks from the Baraboo High School burning on a street in Baraboo, Wisconsin during an anti-German demonstration

Language use had also been the primary focus of legislation at state and local levels. Some of these regulations included the publication of charters banning speaking German within city limits. A total ban on the teaching of German in both public and private education could be found in at minimum 14 states, including some states that would extend this to ban the teaching of all languages except for English, although the majority would ban non-English languages typically only banned German. A total ban on teaching German in both public and private schools was imposed for a time in at least 14 states, including California, Indiana, Wisconsin, Ohio, Iowa and Nebraska. California's ban lasted into the mid-1920s. The Supreme Court case in Meyer v. Nebraska ruled in 1923 that these laws were unconstitutional. In October 1918, a bill intended to restrict federal funds towards states that enforced English-only education was created. On April 9, 1919, Nebraska enacted a statute called "An act relating to the teaching of foreign languages in the state of Nebraska," commonly known as the Siman Act. It provided that "No person, individually or as a teacher, shall, in any private, denominational, parochial or public school, teach any subject to any person in any language other than the English language." It forbade foreign instruction to children who had not completed the eighth grade. In Montana, speaking German was banned in public for two years during World War I. Pennsylvania's legislature passed a German-language ban, but it was vetoed by the governor. Churches during this period such as the Lutheran Church became internally divided over services and religious instruction in German and English.

Closely related to the forced decline of German is the near default of the American war loans to the Triple Entente resulting in the introduction of the first to the fourth Liberty Bonds by the Federal Reserve. After March 1918, the Federal Reserve Bank started to use dozens of mobile "war exhibits" stationed on trains that drove through the US to sell "liberty bonds." Newspapers of the time have stories of harassment of "slackers," who were forced to buy bonds and burn German books during the exhibition.

- "Special Trains to Show War Exhibits.
  F. P. Clayton, of the publicity department of the Federal Reserve Bank, has received a wire from J. W.Hoopes, executive manager of the campaign, who Is now in Washington, saying that he has secured for use in the 11th federal District two special trains which will carry actual war exhibits from the battlefields of Europe. It Is hoped that the trains will be accompanied by officers who have seen actual service. These trains will stop at places, the names of which will be announced later and speeches will be made from the cars."
- "During the visit of a war exhibit train yesterday at Mountain Grove a huge bonfire was made by the pupils of the high schools there into which was thrown every German textbook used In the school During the burning the fire whistles blew and the church bells rang ..."

== Dialects and geographic distribution ==
German speakers in the United States by states in 2000
State	German speakers
California	141,671
New York	92,709
Florida	89,656
Texas	82,117
Ohio	72,647
Pennsylvania	113,117
Illinois	63,366
Michigan	52,366

It should be mentioned at this time that the dialects presented below are only partials to the whole dialectal picture of the stratum of German dialects spoken in the US.

=== Alsatian ===
Alsatian, (German: Elsässisch), is a Low Alemannic German dialect spoken by Old Order Amish and some Old Order Mennonites in Allen County, Indiana, and their daughter settlements. These Amish immigrated to the US in the mid-1800s. There are fewer speakers of Alsatian in Indiana than of Bernese German, even though there are several thousand speakers. There are also speakers of Bernese German and Pennsylvania German living in the community. Most speakers of Alsatian also speak or at least understand Pennsylvania German. Speakers of Alsatian in Indiana are thus exposed to five languages or dialects: Alsatian, Bernese German, Pennsylvania German, Standard German and English.

=== Amana ===
Amana German, West Central German, a Hessian dialect in particular, is still spoken by several hundred people in seven villages in the Amana Colonies in Iowa, which were founded by Inspirationalists of German origin. Amana German is derived from Hessian dialects which fused into a so-called Ausgleichsdialekt that adopted many English words and some English idioms.

=== Bernese ===
Bernese German, (Standard German: Berndeutsch, Alemannic German: Bärndütsch) is a subdialect of High Alemannic German which is spoken by Old Order Amish in Adams County, Indiana, and their daughter settlements. There are several thousand speakers of the dialect in the US.

A link to an interview on YouTube featuring Berndeutsch from Indiana can be found in the citation below.

=== Hutterite ===
Hutterite communities in the United States and Canada speak Hutterite German, an Austro-Bavarian dialect. Hutterite is spoken in the U.S. states of Washington, Montana, North and South Dakota, and Minnesota; and in the Canadian provinces of Alberta, Saskatchewan, and Manitoba.

=== Indiana ===
There is also a significant population of Amish and Old Order Mennonites located in rural areas of Elkhart County and LaGrange County, Indiana, who speak Pennsylvania Dutch. A much smaller community of Pennsylvania Dutch-speaking Amish is found in Parke County, in western Indiana. Many English words have become mixed with this dialect and it is quite different from Standard German (Hochdeutsch), but quite similar to the dialect of the Palatinate region.

Usually, Pennsylvania Dutch (often just "Dutch" or Deitsch) is spoken at home, but English is used when interacting with the general population. The Amish and Old Order Mennonites of northern Indiana often differentiate between themselves and the general population by referring to them, respectively, as the "Amish" and the "English." Pennsylvania "Dutch" is sometimes used in worship services, though this is more common among the Amish than the Mennonites. More mainstream (city) Mennonites may have a working knowledge of the language, but it is not frequently used in conversation or in worship services.

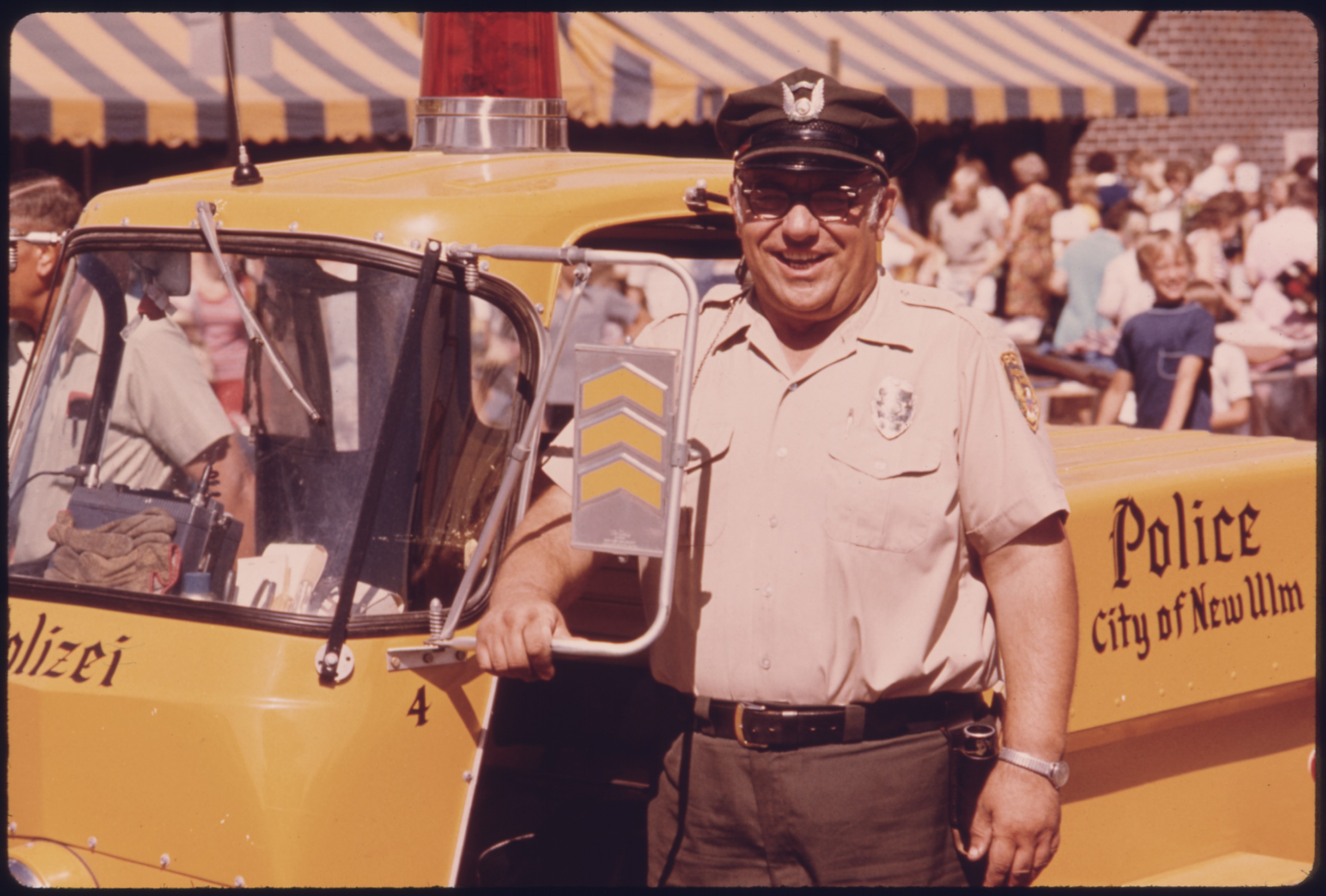
Parking meter checker stands by his police vehicle which is imprinted with the German word for police (Polizei). It is part of the town's highlighting its German ethnic origins. New Ulm, Minnesota, July 1974.

=== Pennsylvania ===
Old Order Amish, Old Order Mennonites and other Pennsylvania Germans speak a dialect of German known as Pennsylvania German, widely called Pennsylvania Dutch, where Dutch is used in its archaic sense, thus not limited to Dutch but including all variants of German. It is a remnant of what was once a much larger German-speaking area in eastern Pennsylvania. Most of the "Pennsylvania Dutch" originate from the Palatinate area of Germany and their language is based on the dialect of that region. While the language is stable among the Old Orders and the number of speakers growing due to the high birth rate among the Old Orders, it is quickly declining among the non-plain Pennsylvania Germans (also called Fancy Dutch).

=== Plautdietsch ===
Plautdietsch, a Low German dialect, is spoken and most often associated with "Russian" Mennonites who immigrated mostly to Kansas in the mid-1870s. These Mennonites also found in Canada tended to slowly assimilate into the mainstream society over several generations, but Plautdietsch-speaking Mennonite immigrants—mainly from Mexico, where there is lesser to no assimilation—brought Plautdietsch back to Kansas. Plautdietsch-speaking Mennonite migrants from Mexico formed a new settlement in Seminole, Texas, in 1977. In 2016 there were about 6,000 Plautdietsch speakers around Seminole.

=== Texas ===
A dialect called Texas German based in the Texas Hill Country still exists but has been dying out since the end of World War II. Following the introduction of English-only schooling during both World Wars, Texas German speakers drifted towards English and few passed the language to their descendants.

In the link provided, an archive of Texas German field recordings can be found. Texas German Archive

=== Wisconsin ===
The various German dialects that were brought to Wisconsin did not develop into a leveled dialect form, like, e.g., in southeastern Pennsylvania, where Pennsylvania German as a leveled dialect emerged, but remained distinct.

In the link provided, an archive of Wisconsin German field recordings can be found on the Datenbank für Gesprochenes Deutsch hosted by the Leibniz Institut für Deutsche Sprache. Other field recordings can be found at the Max Kade Institute as well.

== German as the official U.S. language myth ==
An urban legend, sometimes called the Muhlenberg legend after Frederick Muhlenberg, states that English only narrowly defeated German as the U.S. official language. In reality, the proposal involved a requirement that government documents be translated into German. The United States has no statutory official language; English has been used on a de facto basis, owing to its status as the country's predominant language. In 2025, President Donald Trump signed an executive order declaring English the official language of the United States, but this is not a statute.

In Pennsylvania, which had a large German-American population, German was long permitted as a language of instruction in public schools. State documents were available in German until 1950. As a result of widespread anti-German sentiment during World War I, German fluency decreased from one generation of Pennsylvanians to the next, and today only a small fraction of its residents of German descent are fluent in the German language.

Texas had a large German population from the mid-1840s onward due to the Adelsverein. After Texas was granted statehood in 1845, it required that all laws be officially translated into German. This remained in force until 1917, when the United States entered the First World War.

== German-American tradition in literature ==
As cultural ties between Germany and the United States have been historically strong, a number of important German and U.S. authors have been popular in both countries. In modern German literature, this topic has been addressed frequently by the Boston-born author of German and English lyrical poetry Paul-Henri Campbell.

== Use in education ==
According to a government-financed survey, German was taught in 24% of American schools in 1997, and only 14% in 2008.

German is third in popularity after Spanish and French in terms of the number of colleges and universities offering instruction in the language.

=== Structure of German Language Acquisition by state ===
German Language learners, March 2017
State	Number of Students	Number of High Schools Offering German Instruction
South Dakota	3,289	8
Michigan	30,034	74
New Jersey	10,771	28
Pennsylvania	38,165	107
Georgia	12,699	36
Minnesota	19,877	57
Tennessee	11,269	33
Wisconsin	27,229	80
Hawaii	650	2
Ohio	18,478	64
Connecticut	3,671	13
Virginia	12,030	43
Florida	4,887	19
South Carolina	4,406	18
Texas	19,551	80
Indiana	14,687	62
Maryland	4,833	21
California	9,636	46
New York	7,299	35
Mississippi	1,447	7
Missouri	8,439	44
Nevada	890	5
Maine	1,741	10
Nebraska	3,999	23
Massachusetts	3,367	20
New Hampshire	2,832	17
Illinois	13,293	88
Iowa	3,973	27
Oklahoma	2,207	16
Wyoming	376	3
North Carolina	5,815	53
Idaho	2,279	24
Washington	3,888	43
Kansas	2,427	28
West Virginia	640	8
Alabama	5,333	67
Utah	1,051	15
Vermont	887	13
Louisiana	453	7
Oregon	1,469	24
Colorado	1,509	25
North Dakota	2,046	34
Kentucky	1,421	26
Arkansas	1,947	37
Arizona	1,205	25
Rhode Island	76	2
Montana	260	10
New Mexico	227	11
Alaska	89	8
DC	16	0
all	328,963	1,547

== American German ==
=== Standard American German ===
Standard American German
- Language family: Indo-European: Germanic; West Germanic; Irminones; German; American German; Standard American German

Language codes
- ISO 639-3: –
- IETF: de-US

What here is referred to as Standard American German is a mix of historical words, English loan words, and new words which together are found in the German language used by non-Amish nor Mennonite descendants. The study of the German language in the United States was suppressed during World War I, but has since regained coverage by major universities, most notedly at the University of Kansas from scholars such as William Keel, the Max-Kade Institute of German-American Studies of the University of Wisconsin–Madison and George J. Metcalf from the University of Chicago. While towns may have differing grammatical structures and sometimes pronunciations as influenced by the first immigrant families, their regions, and consequent contact with English, there is no set in stone official grammatical syntax of the American German variety of German and so when taught, that of standard German from Germany is used. Despite the lack of such stabilized syntax, communication is still possible. One speaker might recognize however, that another may be from another community, town, or area.

=== Selected phrases ===
Selected morning greetings
American German	European Standard German	English Translation
Guda Morcha	Guten Morgen	Good morning
Guda Morga	Guten Morgen	Good morning
Guda Marije	Guten Morgen	Good morning
Guten Morgen	Guten Morgen	Good morning

Selected midday greetings
American German	European Standard German	English Translation
Guda Dach	Guten Tag	Good day! [held as a growingly old-fashioned greeting by mainstream American]
Guda Tach	Guten Tag	Good day!
en Guda	einen Guten [Tag]	A good day [to you]!
Was ist neues/neies?	Was gibt es neues?	What's new?

American German	European Standard German	English translation
Ach!	Ach!	Oh!
Geh an!	Geh weiter!	Go on!
Gug amol!	Guck mal!; Schau mal!	Look once!; Look!
Hurry auf!	Beeil dich!	Hurry up!
Scheiße, bitte!	Komm schon!	"Shit, please! [eyeroll]," (literally: "come already") "Oh, please!," Are you kidding me?
Sei so gut und...	Sei so gut und...	Be so good as to... e.g. Be so good as to help your mother set the table.
Sei artig!	Sei artig!; Benimm dich!	Be polite/courteous!
Stell dich/di weg!	Hau ab!/Verschwinde!	Get lost! Go away!
Verdammt!	Verdammt!	Damn!
Was zur Hölle?	Was zur Hölle?	What the hell?

== General American German nouns ==
These nouns have been found in all regions of the United States and are not exclusive to any particular region. Some English loanwords are found via cultural diffusion with English speaking populations and often were introduced given the lack of certain objects (ie. der Truck) in pre-20th century German. Dialect leveling is also found throughout regions where German is still found. Though previous studies have tried to pinpoint certain words to specific locations such as Stinkkatze with Texas German dialects, further research has since found these words in use extending beyond their originally perceived regions. For example the following varieties of Stinkkatze / Stinkkatz' / Stinkkotz / Stinkchaatz (Swiss-German speaking communities) have been found in many midwestern states spanning to Texas.

Modern Standard German	Historic Survivals found in Modern American German	English
Stinktier	Stinkkatz(e)/Stinkotz/Stinkchaatz	skunk
Spaß, Jux	Jux	fun
Junge (Knabe, Bube, Bub)	Knabe/Bub	boy
Hausdiener	Knecht (reported in some Kansas communities)	(male) house servant

American German terms (singular)	European Standard German (singular)	English translation
der Abnemmer	Fotograf (m)	the photographer
der Barrel, "Berl"	Faß (n)	the barrel
der Bu(a)	Junge (m)	the boy
der Bub	Junge (m)	the boy
die Car	Auto (n)	the car
die Change	Veränderung (f)	the change, switch, adjustment
der Columbine	Kolombine (m)	the columbine
die Countrykirch'	Landkirche (f)	the countryside church
der Countryweg	Landstraße (f)	the country road/ "country way"
die Crick	Flüßchen (n)	the creak/stream
der Eichhase/Eichhos'	Eichhörnchen (n)	the squirrel
der Eichkater	Eichhörnchen (n)	the squirrel
der Elevator	Aufzug (m)	the elevator
die Eisbox	der Kühlschrank	the Refrigerator
der Grainelevator	Getreideheber (m)	the grain elevator
der Gel(e)beribe	Karotte (f)	the carrot
der Grosspapa	Grossvater (m)	the grandfather
die Klapperbox	Klavier (n)	the piano
die Farm	Bauernhof (m)	the Farm
die Farmerleute	Bauern (m pl)	the farming people/family of farmers
die Fence	Zaun (m)	the fence
die Fedder	Kuli/Kugelschreiber (m)	the ballpoint pen
Früher	Frühling (m)	the spring [season]
der Heimstead	Eigenheim (n)	the homestead
das Hoch(e)deutsch	Hochdeutsch (n), Standardhochdeutsch (n)	High German, Standard High German
die Kiihler/Kühler	Kühlschrank (m)	the refrigerator
der Korn	Mais (m)	the corn
der Knecht	Hausdiener (m)	the male-servant, the houseboy
das Luftschiff/Luftschipp	Flugzeug (n)	the airship: airplane
die Microwave	Mikrowelle (f)	the microwave
das Piktur	Bild (n)	the picture
das Pocketbuch	Handtasche (f), Geldbeutel (m)	the pocketbook
der Schulmeister die Schulmeisterin	Schulmeister (m) Schulmeisterin (f)	the head teacher
die Schulerei	Gaunerei (f), Schurkerei (f)	troublemaking, trickery, prank, playfulness
die Stinkkatze/Stinkkotz'/Stinkchaatz	Stinktier (n)	the skunk
der Truck	Lastwagen (m)	the truck/Pick-up/18-wheeler
der Weg, Wech	Landstraße (f), Straße (f)	the road / "the way" (dialectal)

=== General American German verbs ===
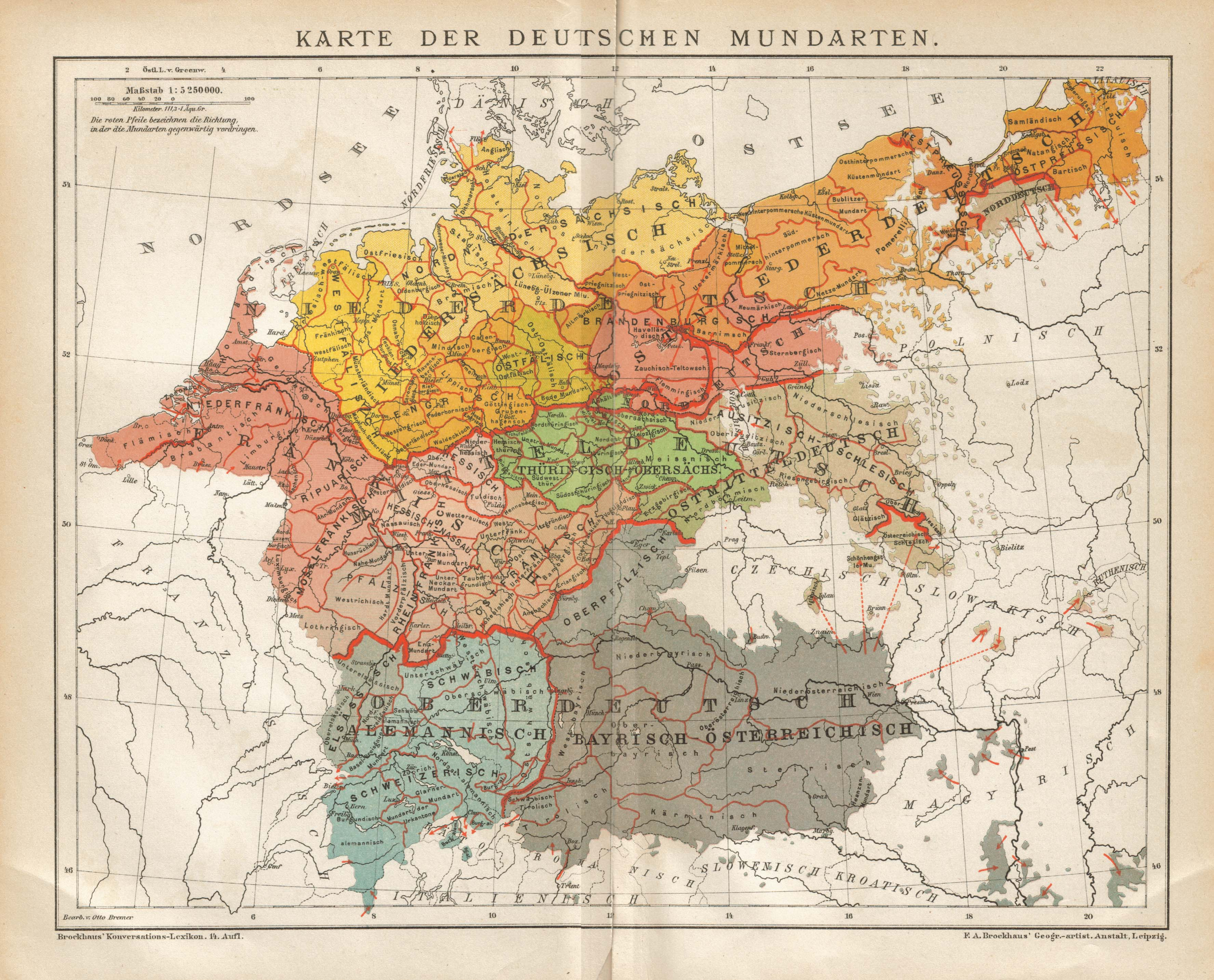
Map of sub-German dialects alongside General Dialect Regions

Throughout the history of the German language in the United States, through the coexistence with English, there are many loanwords which have been absorbed into the American variety of German. There are also many usages which have been preserved in American German varieties including usages from the numerous dialects of the German regions. This preservation is a common phenomenon that occurs when a language leaves its original region: While the language in the original country moves forward, words and meanings in the new region freeze and often do not change along with the mother country.

General American German	European Standard German	English translation
"Ich will ein Piktur abnehmen." "Ich will ein Bild abnehmen."	"Ich will ein Bild machen."	"I want to take a picture."
jemanden/etwas aufraisen	aufwachsen	raise up; to raise [children, agriculture], to cultivate
"Ich ward' hier in dem Township aufgeraist."	"Ich bin hier in dem Dorf aufgewachsen."	"I was raised here in the town."
jemanden/etwas gleichen	jemanden/etwas mögen	to like, appreciate
"Ich hab' den Movie geglichen." "Ich gleich dich!"	"Ich hab den Film sehr gemocht." "Ich mag dich!"	"I liked the movie." "I like you!"
jemanden/etwas heißen	jemand/etwas nennen	to name someone
"Was hab'n sie das Kind geheißt?" [historically accurate use of "heißen - to call/name]	"Wie haben sie das Kind genannt?	"What have you named the child?"
jemanden/etwas pullen	jemanden/etwas ziehen	to pull [something]
"Sie pullen die Beets."	"Sie roden Rüben."	"They pull the beets up."
Zeit spenden	Zeit verbringen	to spend time [doing something]
"Wir dachten, wir könnten Zeit spenden bei deiner Grandmom."	"Wir haben uns gedacht, wir könnten Zeit bei der Oma verbringen."	"We thought we could spend time by/at Grandma's."
verzähle(n), schwätze(n), quatsche(n), plader(n), schnacken, babbel(n), rede(n)	sprechen	to speak, speaking, to converse

=== North Dakota German samples ===
The story of the generally studied North Dakota German originates in southern central Germany. The ancestors of these Germans, also known as Volga Germans, had relocated to Russia in 1763 under invitation by Catherine the Great and organized over one hundred colonies which lined the Volga River near present-day Saratov. By 1884, many of these German-Russians began their journey to present-day North Dakota, and primarily chose to settle in the south-central part of the state. Settlements, as per ethnic tradition in Russia, were often based on "common religious affiliation."

German-Russian Protestants traditionally are the hegemonic group within McIntosh County and the eastern half of Logan County.

German-Russian Catholics traditionally are the hegemonic group within southern Emmons County and branch into western Logan County.

The dialects of these immigrants, alongside cultural differences among the sub-ethnic groups of the "Volga Germans" are today often marked by small differences in meaning, word usage, and sometimes pronunciation which reflects the original regions of Germany from where many of the individuals of this ethnic group have their origins. The dialects of southern Germany often are tied together with shared meanings, sounds, and grammars, though remain distinct in syntax and grammatical pattern and often individual word definitions. Therefore, when studying transcriptions, some varieties of North Dakota German may be understood by Pennsylvania Amish German speakers due to similarities, yet understanding is achievable from general dialect speakers or those familiar with southern German dialects. Though each respective member can establish communication with his own ethnic group's dialect or his town's dialect, neither dialect is the same.

Sample 1

"Mir habe e grosses Haus gehat... Auf einem End war sogar en Storch, hat sein Nest gehat. Die Storche sin nett, was sie dohin meinen. Die Storche, dadraus tragen kein Babies rum. Die kommen frihjahrs [frühjahrs] zurick un Winter spenden sie in der Sid. Wo das kann sei, kennt ich gar nett sage. Sie sin halt immer Sid gange, un zum Frihjahr sin sie komme un ha'n ihre Nester ausgeputzt un ha'n wider - manche, die habe vier Junge kriegt. Dir mersten habe bloss zwei. Ich hab einmal anständig Schläge kriegt von einem Storch. Er hatte Junges, das hat wolle schnell fliege lerne un war au nett star' genug. Un er ist auf der Bode gefalle un der alte Storch hat's nett kenne nuftrage wieder ins Nest. Un er ist halt rumgewandert." - Informant 7, Recorded in April 1976

Sample 2

"Wir verzählen au' immer noch Deutsche bis jetzt, un' unsre kinder au', verzählen au' alle Deutsch. Un' ich hab' Deutsch gelernt daheim, bin Deutsch konfirmiert worden, un' zu unsrer Mutter verzähle ich auch immer noch Deutsch, aber es ist immer halber Englisch. Un' wo ich English gelernt habe, bin ich in Schul' gegange'." - 72 yr old Informant; Lehr, North Dakota, 1975

=== Missouri German samples ===
Over the years, Missouri became a state full of German enclaves.

In 1837 along the Missouri River, School Teacher George Bayer, a German of Philadelphia, traveled to Missouri and purchased 11,000 acres of land. When the first 17 settlers arrived on the newly purchased land, what would become Hermann, Missouri, the land terrain was unexpectedly unsuitable for a town. According to local legend and what could serve as a study for anthropological researchers into the ethnic characteristics of the Low Germans and other German ethnicities, the survival of this town is credited to German ethnic characteristic of perseverance and hard work.

"Ah... Ich heiße [omitted] und ich war... mein ganzes Leben war ich ein Farmer, und ich bin noch Farmer. Wir haben Rindvieh, Schweine, und ich baue Seubohne und Mais. Wir haben Hähne, En'en [Enten], Truthahn, bisschen von alles - ein Esel. Ja, ich habe 1979 angefangen im Postamt - 1979 und ah, ich konnte deutsch sprechen wie die andere im Postamtplatz. Alli konnten deutsch sprechen, und es hat gut gepasst, dass ich auch deutsch sprechen konnte. Aber diese sind... Alli meine Kameraden, wo an dem Postamt waren sind jetzt tot -- außer einer: Der Carl [omitted]. Er lebt noch. So er ist 89. Alli anderen sind tot.' Hermann German ("Hermanndeutsch") - Male Farmer informant, McKittrick, Missouri, 2014

While Hermann German is a recognized form of German, other German settlements and German American farms where German was and is spoken can still be found to this day. This form of Saxon from the dialect of the region of Hannover, Germany can still be heard in pockets surrounding St. Louis, Missouri and in other reaches of the state. Sample 2 (Conversational Saxon)

Speaker 1: "'s freut mich doch dass wir widor zusamm'n komm'n kenn'n."

- Speaker 2: "Well danke schoen! Das freut mich auch! Mir sehen immor noch ziemlih gude aus!"
- Speaker 1: "Ja. mir sind ja schon ald obor geht amol ganz gut."
- Speaker 2: "Immor noch jung"

Excerpt from the interview: "Mir wuess'en kein Deitsch" This informant quickly fixed his mistake and said "Englisch". His corrected sentence in English:"We knew no English [when we went to school]."

Saxon German ("Deitsch"), two male interviewees, Perry County Lutherans, 2018

St. Genevieve, Missouri has also been the site of massive historic immigrant in-moving. The main groups of historic mention are the French-Americans of the area and migrants from Baden-Württemberg. The migrations of the latter occurred primarily in the later decades of the 19th century. In recent years, the preserved alemannic dialect in the town of New Offenburg was recorded in the documentary film “New Offenburg.” Sample 3 (Conversational New Offenburg Alemannic German)

"In de Morga, well all de do um mi... mi... mi Pecanbaum, [a Eichhos'] ist gsucht gang hette und het a Pecan gessa. Des woar boutta halb Stunde zuruck - a roder Eichhos'."

New Offenburg Alemannic German ("Dietsch") from "New Offenburg"

- Informant 1: "Oh ya! Ich gleych süss' Korn."
- Informant 2: "Er het a groasse Booch"
- Informant 1: "Na dann."
- Informant 2: "Aer esst gut! Unsere Muodor, wenn sie kocht het, het sie nix g'messerd. Eh bissili Salz und ah bissili Pfeffor und a [indiscernible], no het sie es tasted, und um, wenn's noch gut taste hätt', denn hätt' sie's stoppt und het sie's kocht. Sie woar d' best Koch was ich ever -- uh was mir khed hend."

New Offenburg Alemannic German ("Dietsch") from "New Offenburg"

=== German language schools ===
- Rilke Schule German Immersion School, Anchorage, AK
- Fairview-Clifton German Language School, Cincinnati
- German American School, Portland, Oregon
- German Language School, Cleveland
- German Language School, Columbus, Ohio
- German School Phoenix, Tempe, Arizona
- Goethe-Instituts in Atlanta, Boston, Chicago, New York City, San Francisco and Washington, D.C.
- Milwaukee German Immersion Elementary School, Milwaukee
- Twin Cities German Immersion School, St. Paul, Minnesota
- Waldsee (camp) near Bemidji, Minnesota
- German International School Boston
- German Saturday School Boston
- German International School Chicago
- German School New York
- German International School of Silicon Valley
- German School Washington, D.C.
- SAGA Seattle Area German American School, Seattle, WA

== See also ==
- American Association of Teachers of German
- Bennett Law, 1889 Wisconsin law to prohibit teaching in German
- German Americans
- German American National Congress
- German-American Heritage Foundation of the USA
- History of childhood in the United States#19th century German Americans
- Nativism (politics) in the United States#English Only
- Nativism (politics) in the United States#Anti-German
