= Lac du Bois =

Lac du Bois may refer to:

- Lac du Bois (camp), a French language summer camp in Minnesota, USA.
- Lac du Bois Grasslands Protected Area, a provincial park in British Columbia, Canada.

== See also ==
- Lake of the Woods (Lac des Bois), a lake lying between Canada and the USA.
