= German-Texan Heritage Society =

Non-profit cultural organization in Texas

- Type: Nonprofit
- Headquarters: German Free School
- Location: Austin, Texas, United States
- Publication: The GTHS Journal
- Website: www.germantexans.org

The German-Texan Heritage Society is a nonprofit organization headquartered in Austin, Texas dedicated to preserving the cultural heritage of German Texans and promoting German culture throughout the state.

== History ==
The German-Texan Heritage Society was formed in 1978 by members of the annual Society for German-American Studies symposium. The organization moved into its current headquarters at the German Free School in downtown Austin in 1991.

In 2010, the German-Texan Heritage Society was designated a Preserve America Steward by the Advisory Council on Historic Preservation.

== Leadership ==
As of 2026, the German-Texan Heritage Society staff, a paid team which coordinates the organization's volunteer efforts, is helmed by Executive Director Christopher Markley. The society's board of directors is currently led by President Margo Blevins.

== Activities ==
=== Education ===
The German-Texan Heritage Society offers German language instruction for children and adults.

==== German International School of Texas ====
In 2021, the society opened the German International School of Texas, a German language immersion school serving preschoolers, kindergarteners, and first graders.

==== German Saturday School ====
The German-Texan Heritage Society has offered German courses for children on Saturdays since 1995 and has since expanded to San Antonio.

=== Events ===
The German-Texan Heritage Society hosts yearly Maifest – German Texan Beer & Wine Festival, Karneval, and Oktoberfest festivities, a German Auto Show, St. Martin's Umzug, as well as a well-attended Christmas Market in Austin. Additionally, the organization's annual meeting is held in a different Texas City each year, for example Austin, San Antonio, Temple, Galveston, Comfort, La Grange, Waco, among others.

=== Library ===
The society's headquarters at the German Free School is home to the Charles G. Trenckmann Family Library, which contains genealogy resources and other publications about German heritage in Texas.
