= Sjölunden =

Language immersion campsite in Minnesota

Sjölunden (Swedish: sjö: lake, lund: grove) is the Swedish language camp site associated with Concordia Language Villages and is located at the Concordia site at Turtle River Lake, near Bemidji, Minnesota. After 30 years without an architecturally authentic Swedish site, the first step towards a village was taken on August 11, 2006 when groundbreaking for the new site took place. Sjölunden can house approximately 85 people at a time.

Sjölunden is a village for language immersion where American villagers come to live and experience Swedish language and culture.

== History ==
The Swedish language was added to Concordia Language Villages in 1975 as the sixth language, following German (1961), French (1962) Spanish, Norwegian (both 1963) and Russian (1966).

Sjölunden moved to Salolampi, the Finnish site, shortly after it was built in the early 1990s.

== The new site ==
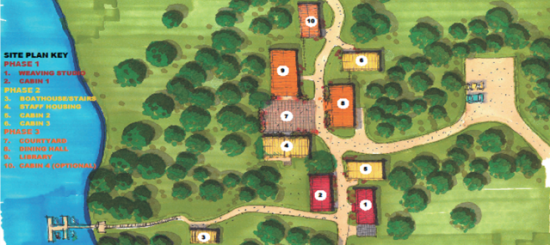
Map of planned buildings for the Sjölunden new site

Groundbreaking for the new Sjölunden site took place on August 11, 2006. Architectural inspiration has been taken from Swedish fishing villages, of which there are a lot on the Swedish west coast. The village was designed by Saint Paul, Minnesota architect Kerrik Wessel, AIA, in 2004.

The new Sjölunden is located right next to the Finnish site at Turtle River Lake. Rather than being a village on its own, it is designed to complement the Finnish site. Some facilities will be missing from Sjölunden, such as a soccer field, beach, and a camp store. Additionally, the three cabins will not be sufficient to house all villagers and staff.

A list of the new site buildings and the years they were completed, in order of completion.

- Vävstugan (the weaving studio) 2007
- Båthuset (the boathouse) 2007
- Visby* (villager cabin) 2008
- Birka* (villager cabin) 2010
- Gamla Uppsala (the staff housing unit) 2009
- Biblioteket (the library) 2014
- Sigtuna* (villager cabin) 2019
- Matsalen (the dining hall) anticipated
