= Liechtensteiners =

Ethnic group

Total population
- c. 34,000 (Liechtensteiners worldwide: 2000)

Languages
- German (Alemannic German); Swiss-German Sign Language

Religion
- Historically Christian (predominantly Roman Catholic, with other small minorities)

Related ethnic groups
- Swabians, Swiss Germans and Vorarlbergers

Liechtensteiners (German: Liechtensteiner, pronounced [ˈlɪçtn̩ˌʃtaɪ̯nɐ]) are people native to Liechtenstein descended from both Swiss Germans and Swabians. Approximately 34,000 Liechtensteiners were noted at the turn of the 21st century.

== History ==
The region now ruled by Liechtenstein was first inhabited during the Neolithic Period and has been an independent state under the rule of the Princely House of Liechtenstein since 1719. Modern Liechtensteiners are descendants of the Alemanni people.

== Etymology ==
The word Liechtenstein come from Middle High German lieht (light) and stein (stone rock).

== Distribution ==
=== Liechtenstein ===
Approximately two-thirds (66.2%) of Liechtenstein's population, or 26,205 people, are Liechtensteiners.

=== United States ===
Liechtensteiner Americans in the United States number 1,244. The first recorded Liechtensteiner to move to America was Joseph Batliner. In 1846, a flood followed by a famine caused 250 Liechtensteiners to move to America; this was the first large wave of emigration from Liechtenstein. Dubuque, Iowa became the favored destination for Liechtensteiners moving to America, because the community was German-speaking. Liechtensteiners in Dubuque formed a close-knit community often marrying each other and godfathering each other's children. After this wave, a small trickle continued with spikes after World War I and World War II.

=== Other Locations ===
Small numbers of Liechtensteiners immigrated to Canada and South America, mainly to Brazil and Argentina.

== Religion ==
Roman Catholicism is the state religion of Liechtenstein. As of the 2020 census, 70% of Liechtensteiners were Catholic, while 8% were other Christians. Sixteen percent practiced other faiths (6% Muslim, 10% no affiliation), while 4% were undeclared.

== Culture ==
Much of Liechtenstein's culture come from nearby European influences.

=== Language ===
The language most prevalent among Liechtensteiners is Alemannic German, with 1,300 people (primarily in Triesenberg and Malbun) speaking Walser German. Liechtensteiner Americans speak American English.

=== Holidays ===
Liechtenstein has 20 public holidays, which are: New Year's Day, Saint Berchtold's Day, Epiphany, Candlemas, Shrove Tuesday, Saint Joseph's Day, Good Friday, Easter Monday, Labour Day, Ascension Day, White Monday, Corpus Christi, National Day, Nativity of Mary, All Saints' Day, Feast of the Immaculate Conception, Christmas Eve, Christmas Day, St. Stephen's Day, and New Year's Eve.

== Sources ==
- Waldman, Carl; Mason, Catherine (2006). Encyclopedia of European Peoples. Infobase Publishing. p. 296. ISBN 1438129181.
- Minahan, James (2000). One Europe, many nations: a historical dictionary of European national groups. Greenwood Publishing Group. p. 769. ISBN 0313309841.
