= Sup sogŭi Hosu =

Korean language camp in United States

Location
- 11380 Turtle River Lake Rd NE, Bemidji, MN 56601; United States
- Coordinates: 47.57858°N 94.71653°W

Information
- Established: 1999
- Founder: Ross King
- Status: Open during summers
- Dean: Ross King
- Director: Dafna Zur
- Language: Korean
- Website: concordialanguagevillages.org/youth-languages/korean-language-village

Korean name
- Hangul: 숲속의 호수
- RR: Supsogui hosu
- MR: Supsogŭi hosu

Sup sogŭi Hosu (Korean: 숲속의 호수; lit. Lake of the Woods) is a residential program for the Korean language and culture in Bemidji, Minnesota, United States. It is part of the 501(c)(3) non-profit Concordia Language Villages, and is sponsored by Concordia College. It first opened in 1999, and as of 2023 it had over 3,000 attendees across its history.

Its founding dean is Ross King, Professor of Korean at the University of British Columbia. The program is currently led by Dafna Zur, associate professor in the Department of East Asian Languages and Cultures at Stanford University and King's former PhD student.

== History ==
Ross King is a Canadian linguist and Koreanist. He himself attended the Concordia Language Villages system from ages 10 to 18, where he studied the Spanish, German, and Russian languages.

Early on in Sup sogŭi Hosu's history, there was spare capacity each year for more students. However, after the success of the Korean Wave, the program has seen a significant increase in popularity, with over a hundred participants each year and a waitlist of 120 students in 2023.

The program originally did not have its own dedicated facilities; King previously rented buildings in the Luther Crest Bible Camp or Russian language village for the program. But in 2018, it received $5 million in funding via a private donation from the Korean handbag company Simone Corporation. This enabled the program to create its own separate infrastructure. Construction began in 2019. The donation is the single largest in support of Korean language education in North America, and the largest in Concordia's history. Kenny Park, the CEO of Simone, attributed the donation to a radio interview of King that he heard, where King advocated for greater public and private support from Korean companies to fund international Korean language education. The new year-round site was designed with the consultation of South Korean architect B. A. You of Archigroup MA, who used elements of Korean culture and architecture. The program was also expressly designed to include a dojang, a training hall for Korean martial arts (notably taekwondo). The Korean program was the eighth such program to have its own facilities in Concordia, and the only one for an East Asian language.

In 2024 the first phase of the new site was completed and opened for the summer session. It includes two multi-purpose residences for participants, a dining hall, soccer field, waterfront, and more. There is ongoing fundraising for the second phase of development which will add a sports center, more villager residences for increased capacity, and a cultural center.

The program, as well as the overall Concordia Language Villages, experienced a severe slowdown and financial setback during the COVID-19 pandemic, but by 2022 the Korean Language Village reported being back up to 70% of its capacity.

== Activities ==
As a language and culture immersion program, all counselors are required to speak Korean at all times in front of the participants. All signage in the program is even written in Korean. Participants engage in cultural activities, including calligraphy, K-pop dance, taekwondo (reportedly once taught by Zur, who is experienced in the sport), fan dance (buchaechum), Korean paper crafting, and Korean tea ceremonies. Korean food is served at the program.
