= Texas Germans =

Texans of German descent

Texas Germans Texas Deutsche
Regions with significant populations
- Texas

Languages
- Texas German, Texas English, Denglisch

Religion
- Christianity

Related ethnic groups
- Missouri Rhinelanders, Louisiana Creoles, Pennsylvania Dutch, German Americans

Texas Germans (German: Texas-Deutsche) are descendants of German Americans who settled in Texas from the 1830s. The arriving Germans tended to cluster in ethnic enclaves; most settled in a broad, fragmented belt across the south-central part of the state, where many became farmers. As of 1990, about three million Texans considered themselves German in ancestry.

== History ==
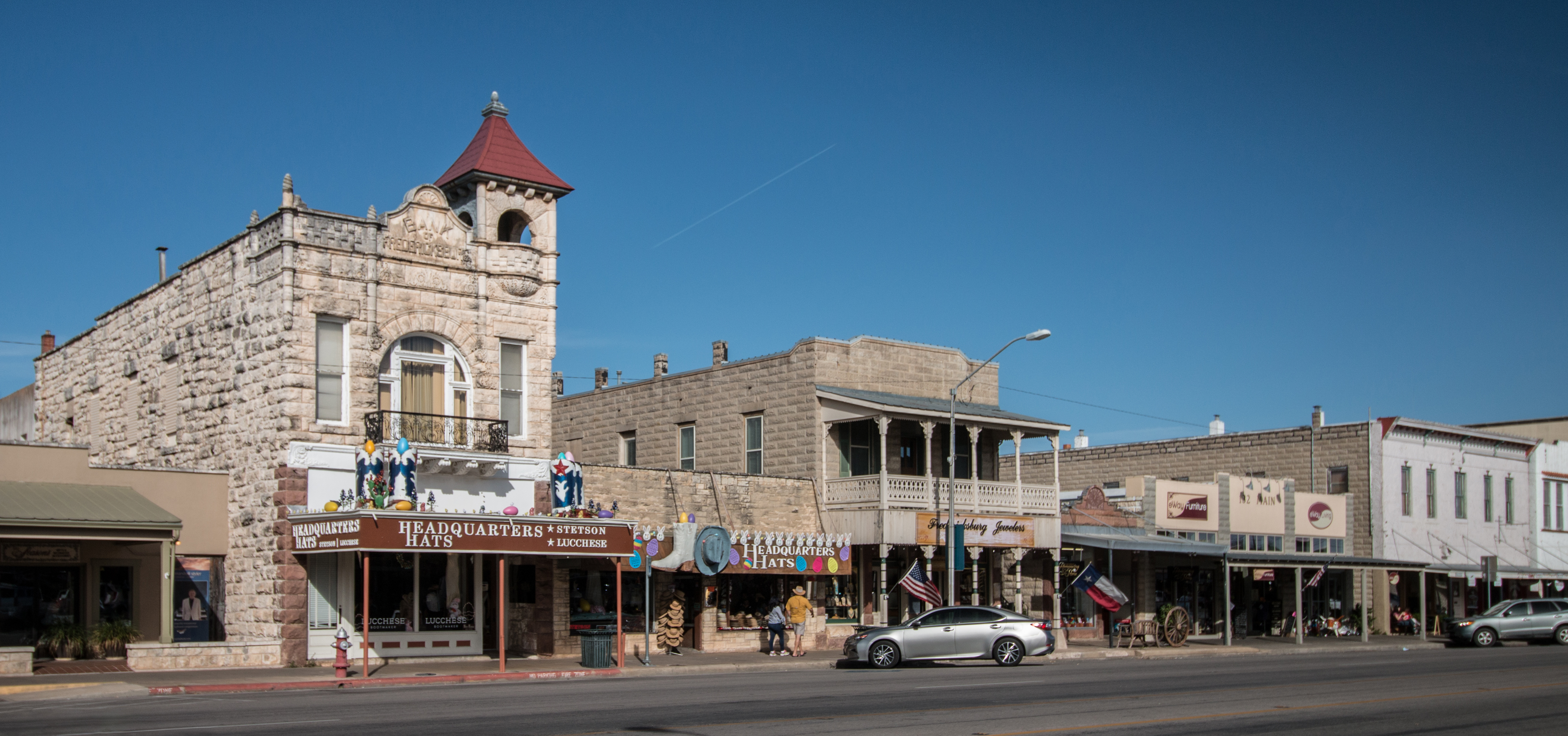
Fredericksburg German Quarter

Emigration in force began during the period of the Republic of Texas (1836–1846) following the establishment in 1842 of the Adelsverein (Verein zum Schutze deutscher Einwanderer, Society for the Protection of German Immigrants in Texas) by a group of Germans dedicated to colonizing Texas.

The Adelsverein helped establish German colonies throughout the state, including purchasing the Fisher–Miller Land Grant, some 5,000 square miles between the Colorado and Llano Rivers. In 1847, John O. Meusebach, acting as commissioner of the Adelsverein, negotiated the Meusebach–Comanche Treaty to settle German colonists on the land grant. It remains the only unbroken treaty between European-American colonists and Native Americans.

A large portion of the early settlers following statehood were Forty-Eighters, emigres from the Revolutions of 1848, who dispersed into areas of Central Texas. After generations, German Texans spoke what became known as Texas German (German: Texasdeutsch), a German language dialect that was tied to the historic period of highest immigration. In Germany, the language developed differently from how it did among the relatively isolated ethnic colonies in the US. The dialect has largely died out since the First and Second World Wars, as have many other US German dialects.

Texas Germans were strong abolitionists during the 1850s. In the American Civil War, they opposed martial law and military conscription, and were made victims at the Nueces massacre. After Reconstruction, Texas Germans lived in relative obscurity as teachers, doctors, civil servants, politicians, musicians, farmers, and ranchers. They founded the towns of Bulverde, New Braunfels, Fredericksburg, Boerne, and Comfort in the Texas Hill Country, and Schulenburg, Walburg, and Weimar to the east.

German-American cultural institutions in Texas include the Sophienburg Museum in New Braunfels, the Pioneer Museum in Fredericksburg, the Witte-Schmid Haus Museum in Austin County, the German-Texan Heritage Society, and the Texas German Society.

=== Black Texas Germans ===
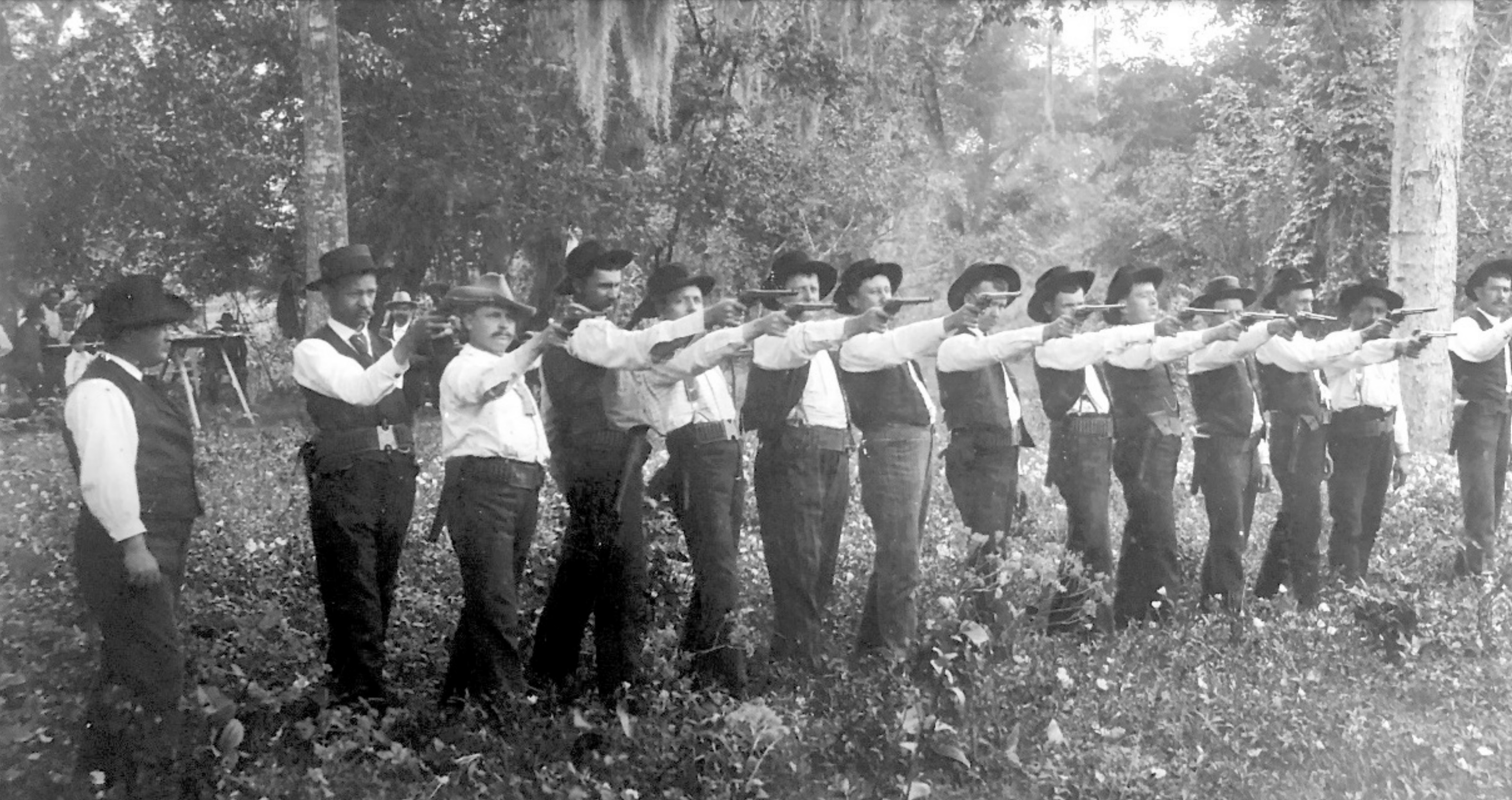
Texas Germans aiming pistols; a Black Texas German is on the far left

Texas Germans engaged with Black people economically and socially in the 1800s. Black Texans interacted much easier with Texas Germans than with Anglo-Texans; Black Freedom colonies shared economic ties with Texas German communities, and maintained cordial relationships.

After the Civil War, reports indicate Black Texas German communities in every county of the German belt, also known as the Texas German Country, running from Houston to the Hills Region. For Black Texans, speaking Texas German was a means of social mimicry and protection.

Doris Williams, an African American in Bastrop County, recalls:

"We lived near Smithville Texas with my grandparents, and they always referred to people as Dutch... the thing that fascinated me most about them was that they never said anything negative about German people... you know, they would say 'Oh, he's German, you know that German family.' But they never said anything bad about them, and I felt that was unique, because they did say bad things about other people, but not about the Germans."

Black Texans and Texas Germans had a strong political bond, and supported the same political parties. This bond became increasingly crucial, especially during the height of anti-German sentiment in the 1920s when the Ku Klux Klan began persecuting Texas Germans, seeking to eliminate the Texas German ethnicity in Texas. The Black-German alliance gave Black and German communities mutual protection.

== See also ==
- German-Texan Heritage Society
- List of German Texans
- Texas German language
- History of Fredericksburg, Texas
- Nueces Massacre
- German immigration to Mexico
- German Palatines
- Pennsylvania Dutch
- History of Germany
