= Concordia Language Villages =

Location
- 901 8th St. S. Moorhead, Minnesota 56562; United States; 47°33′1″N 94°43′42″W

Information
- Motto: "to inspire courageous global citizens"
- Denomination: Lutheran (historical)
- Opened: 1961
- Founder: Gerhard Haukebo
- Status: Open
- Authority: Concordia College
- Director: Mary Maus Kosir 2020 - present
- Staff: 1300
- Age: 7 to 18
- Enrollment: 11880
- Student to teacher ratio: 1:5
- Classes offered: Arabic, Chinese, Danish, English, Finnish, French, German, Italian, Japanese, Korean, Norwegian, Portuguese, Russian, Spanish, Swedish
- Hours in school day: 24
- Slogan: N/A (2025)
- Song: N/A (2025)
- Accreditation: Commission on International and Trans-Regional Accreditation; North Central Association Commission on Accreditation and School Improvement
- Communities served: all 50 U.S. States, more than 25 countries
- Alumni: Chelsea Clinton
- Website: concordialanguagevillages.org

Concordia Language Villages (CLV), previously the International Language Villages, is a 501(c)(3) nonprofit organization based in Moorhead, Minnesota which operates a language and cultural immersion program, sponsored by the Concordia College. Languages (14 as of 2025) are taught in summer camps, called "villages". School-year weekend programs are also offered, mostly for Spanish, French, and German. Annually, the program is attended by over 13,000 young people, aged 7–18, from every state of the US, as well as Canada and 31 other countries. It was founded in 1961.

== Villages ==
There are architecturally and culturally authentic village sites (Arabic, Chinese, Danish, Finnish, French, German, Italian, Japanese, Korean, Norwegian, Portuguese, Russian, Spanish, and Swedish) located near Bemidji, Minnesota on Turtle River Lake. There are also leased sites throughout Minnesota, as well as abroad in Switzerland and China.

The road connecting the permanent villages at Turtle River Lake to the county road was purposefully constructed to be winding, to simulate the long trip to the target cultures represented at the villages. The original plans for these villages included a train to link all of the villages. Although this idea was scrapped, aspects of it still remain in several buildings. The German village's four-story administration building resembles a German train station and is called the Bahnhof ("train station"). The dining hall at Salolampi, the Finnish language village, is modeled after a famous Finnish train station. Additionally, the Turtle River Lake site has a World Inc. Peace Site with peace poles in the village languages at its heart, near the Norwegian village, Skogfjorden and the Bemidji and Turtle River Lake sites have European road signs in kilometers per hour (imported from Germany, not replications).

Several immigrant buildings have been moved to the permanent sites to show villagers what life was like for early European immigrants. The immigrant cabins at the Norwegian village are original to the site. The German "Haus Sonnenaufgang" was first moved from New Ulm, Minnesota to sit next to the Norwegian ones, but was moved sometime in the early 1990s to the German village near Bemidji, Minnesota.

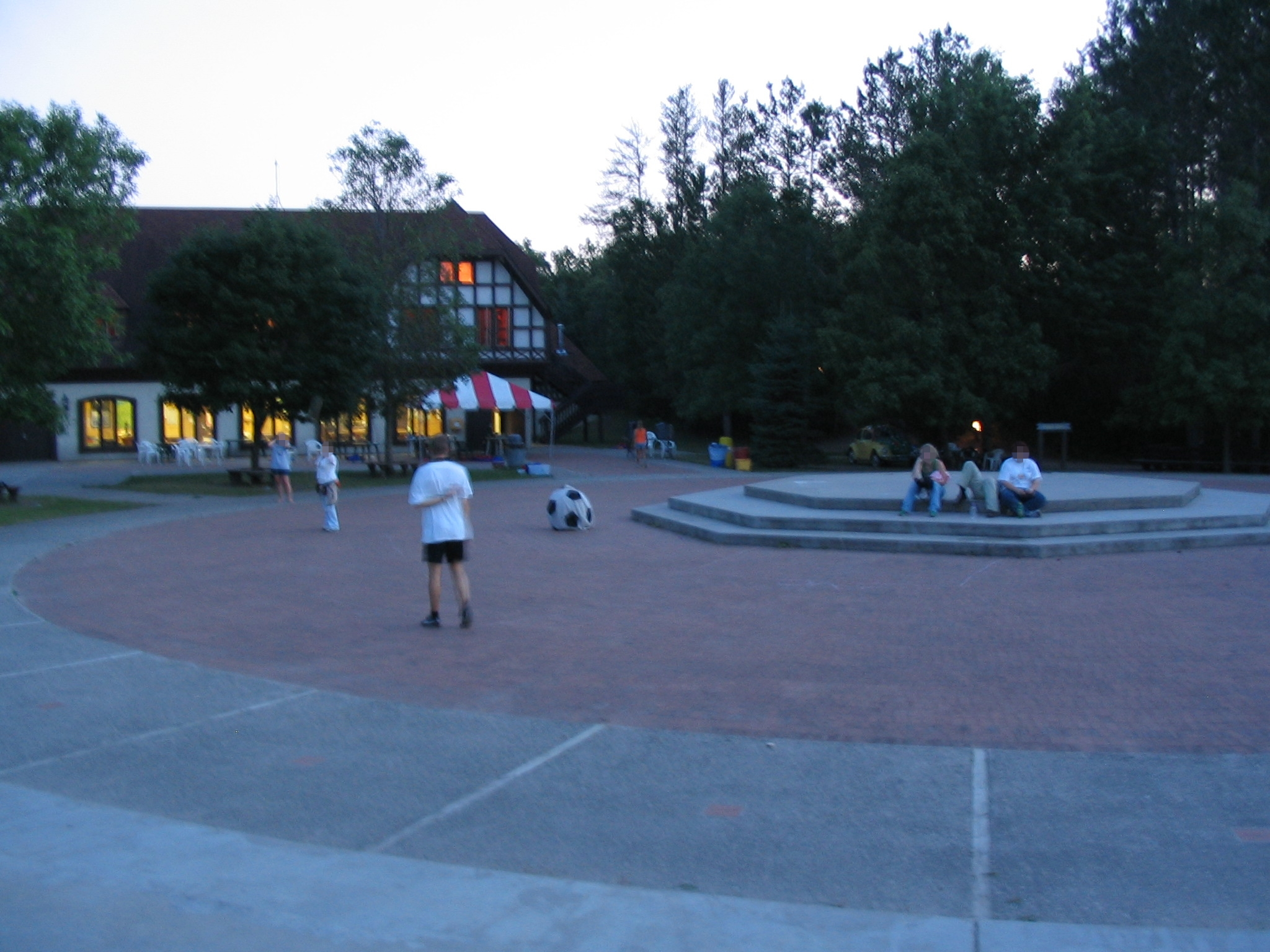
Waldsee Markplatz near Bemidji, Minnesota. The culturally-authentic Gasthof dining hall can be seen in the background.

CLV consists of 14 villages, as of 2026:

- German: Waldsee (est. 1961)
- French: Lac du Bois or Les Voyageurs (est. 1962)
- Spanish: El Lago Del Bosque (est. 1963)
- Norwegian: Skogfjorden (est. 1963)
- Russian: Lesnoe Ozero (Лесное озеро) (est. 1966)
- Swedish: Sjölunden (est. 1975)
- Finnish: Salolampi (est. 1978)
- Danish: Skovsøen (est. 1982)
- Chinese: Sen Lin Hu (森林湖) (est. 1984)
- Japanese: Mori no Ike (森の池) (est. 1988)
- Korean: Sup sogŭi Hosu (숲 속의 호수) (est. 1999)
- Italian: Lago del Bosco (est. 2003)
- Arabic: Al-Wāḥa (الواحة) (est. 2006)
- Portuguese: Mar e Floresta (est. 2008)

Each village is named "Lake of the Woods" in its language (as the villages are situated in the woods next to a lake); the Portuguese village "Mar e Floresta" (meaning "Sea and Forest"), and the Arabic village "Al-Wāḥa" (meaning "the oasis"). The Japanese village "Mori no Ike" translates to "Pond of the Forest," but this name was chosen in lieu of the more-literal translation (which would use 林 hayashi 'woods' and 湖 mizuumi 'lake') for length and ease of pronunciation.

=== Village culture ===
Villagers performing skits

Villagers use CLV-issued "passport" booklets to manage their camp bank account and familiarize themselves with the use of a real-life passport. Villagers also go through "customs" upon arrival, which includes the storage of phones or other devices with internet connection, non-target language literature, and food (perishable items are disposed of).

Each language village site has numerous traditions, many of which are related to meals and songs. Meal presentations, in which each food and its name are presented in a short skit before each meal, are a language tool implemented by almost all programs. Many villages also put on a restaurant night for villagers to practice going out using their target language. Restaurants will often be fancy affairs that tend to represent international cuisine and languages that are not represented by the villages, such as Vietnamese, Indian, Thai, or Tibetan.

The cuisine in most villages reflect the ethnic cuisines of the target language. At Waldsee, this means that German regional food, Austrian, Swiss and common import foods like Turkish döner kebab are served. At Lac du Bois, foods of Africa and the Caribbean may be included.

The fusion of American and foreign cultures gives rise to linguistic phenomenon referred to as "Franglais" (French and anglais) or "Denglish" (Deutsch and English), depending on the languages in contact. Examples include "Je need a couteau" ("I need a knife") or "What did you seh at the Kino?" ("What did you see at the movie theatre?"). Villagers at every camp employ a unique variety of code-switching with English and the target language. Site buildings are given names in the target language, are rarely referred to with their English names, even when speaking English. Additionally, some words have been invented by native-speaking staff members for concepts that are not native to the target cultures but daily words in camp life, such as "chipmunk", "poison ivy", and "mosquito repellent".

=== Village activities ===
A typical day at one of the Villages includes cultural and typical summer camp activities. In the target language, villagers might go canoeing, create art projects, play traditional music, practice yoga, play ping pong, or make a film. Camp songs and daily skits are an integral part of the village experience, including at mealtimes, as are jokes, games, and weekend dances, all of which surround campers with the language.

Villagers may sign up for two-week or four-week programs, the latter of which are accredited academic programs which gives students high school credit via "a thematic curriculum, experiential immersion techniques and performance-based assessments." To earn the 180 hours to gain credit at a high school, villagers attend multiple structured classes during the day with a higher level of focus on reading, writing, listening, and conversation. "Credit villagers", as they are often referred to in English, are still able to participate in all-camp activities such as evening programs, sports, arts and crafts, and other unique offerings in each village.

== Programs ==
Concordia Language Villages has offered a 10-day, 4-credit graduate level course for teachers in second languages and immersion, along with various adult programs to serve its diverse audience, not all of which are offered in every language. High school credit abroad programs were formerly offered in China, France, Germany, Japan, Spain, Cameroon, and Argentina.

During the summer, CLV serves youth with villages in the United States. Villagers can stay for one week, two weeks, or four week programs, and it is possible to earn high school or college credit for the time spent being immersed in the language. Wilderness programs during the summer offer additional opportunities to spend time in the outdoors of Minnesota for those who enjoy the environment, exploration, and camping. Many camps also offer other themed programs, such as French African or Swiss culture (which is a blend of the German, French, and Italian villages) or the Middle Ages in combination with theatre. Summer day camps are offered for younger learners who live in the area, and family week programs during the summer serve entire families, even those with young children.

Between September and June, CLV offers weeks and weekends of immersion for adults, families, teachers, and school groups. These programs meet over weekends and long weekends, and each school year has a theme for its weekend.

=== International Day ===
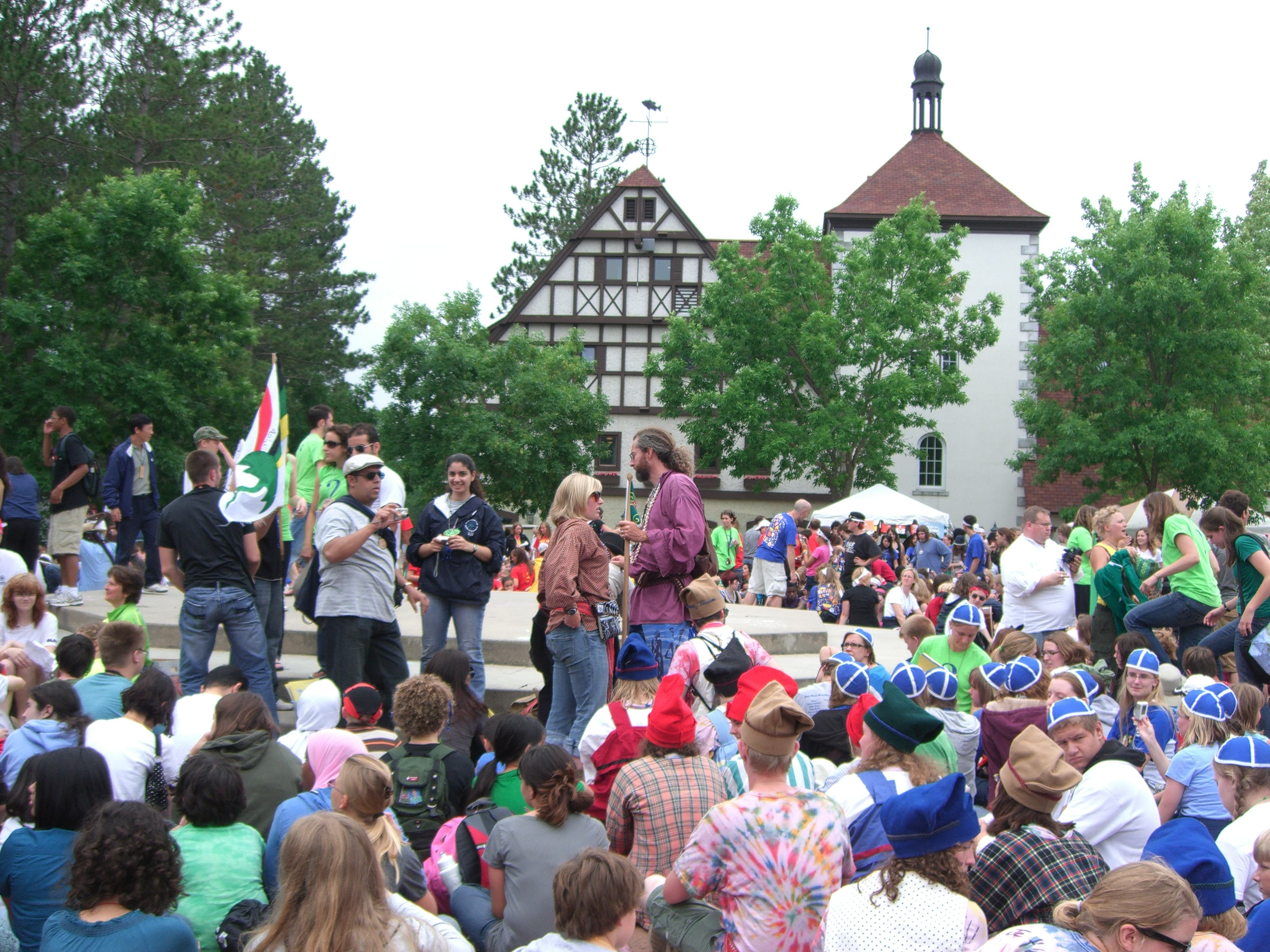
Immediately before the International Day festival closing program, in front of Waldsee's Bahnhof administrative building

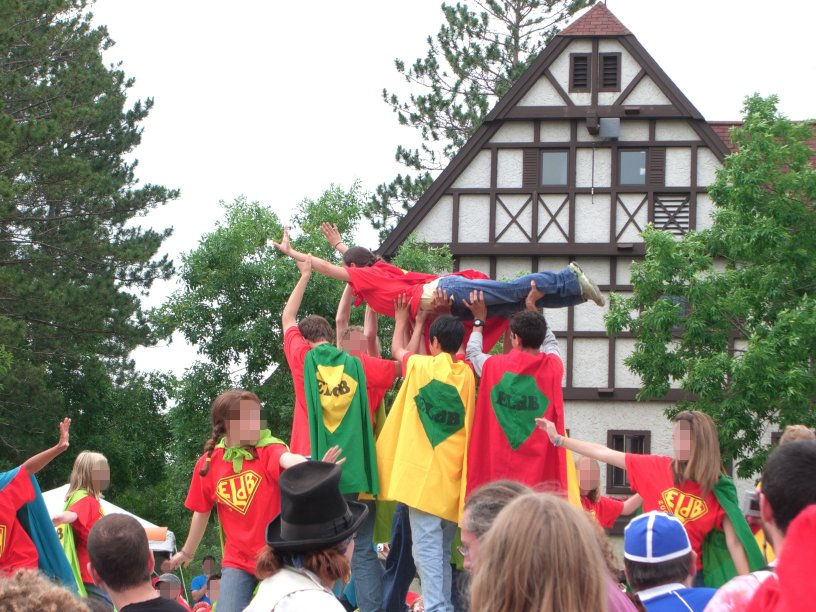
First-half closing program performance of El Lago del Bosque, 2008

During each half of the summer, all the camps within driving distance travel to Waldsee, the German camp, for a day-long festival of cultures called International Day, or I-Day. The camps bring out their wares and each has a booth of ethnic food to share, and each camp prepares a short closing performance to share. Each year has a different theme. Additionally, campers in every village learn a choreographed dance to the year's "I-Day song" during the two weeks preceding I-Day. This is a song from a language not covered by the camps; everyone dances to it together during the festival. Due to the COVID-19 pandemic, International Day has been postponed until further notice.

== International ties ==
=== Notable visits ===
Over the years, Concordia Language Villages has been visited by numerous dignitaries and supporters, including:

- Spanish Consul General Rodrigo Aguirre de Cárcer (1983)
- German Ambassador Peter Hermes (1983)
- German Ambassador Günther van Well (1987)
- Minnesota Governor Arne Carlson (1991)
- Arkansas Governor Bill Clinton (1991 and 1992)
- Finnish Ambassador Jaakko Laajava (1998)
- German Ambassador Jürgen Chrobog (1998)
- Austrian Ambassador Peter Moser (2002)
- Ambassador of Norway Knut Vollebæk (2003)
- Ambassador of the Federal Republic of Germany Wolfgang Ischinger (2003),
- Italian Consul General in Chicago Eugenio Sgró (2003)
- Finnish Consul General in New York Jukka Leino (2003)
- Finnish Ambassador Jukka Valtasaari (2004)
- Ambassador of the Principality of Liechtenstein Claudia Fritsche (2004)
- Deputy Chief of Mission of the Federal Republic of Germany Klaus-Peter Gottwald (2005)
- Deputy Chief of Mission of Sweden Caroline Vicini (2005)
- Counsellor of the Royal Norwegian Embassy Kirsten Hammelbo (2005)
- Ambassador of the Federal Republic of Germany Klaus Scharioth (2007)
- Second Secretary for Cultural Affairs at the Russian Embassy Irina Khortonen (2007)
- Swiss Ambassador Urs Ziswiler (2008)
- United Nations Under-Secretary-General for Communications and Public Information Kiyotaka Akasaka (2008)
- United Nations Under-Secretary-General for General Assembly and Conference Management Muhammad Shaaban (2011)
- U.S. Senator Amy Klobuchar (2018)

=== International patronage granted ===
His Majesty King Harald V of Norway has granted royal patronage to Skogfjorden, the Norwegian Language Village. Patronage is an affirmation from the Royal Family of Norway of the quality educational programming of Concordia Language Villages.

In 2009, Tove Irene Dahl, the dean of Skogfjorden, was named a Knight of the First Class of the Royal Norwegian Order of Merit, by His Majesty King Harald V of Norway for the advancement of Norwegian language and culture in the United States.

Johannes Rau, former President of the Federal Republic of Germany has also granted personal patronage to Waldsee, the German Language Village. This patronage is symbolic of the strong bonds between the people of Germany and Concordia Language Villages.
