= Walburg, Texas =

Coordinates: 30°44′13″N 97°34′49″W

Walburg, originally called Concordia, is an unincorporated area located at the crossroads of Farm to Market Road 972 (FM 972) and Farm to Market Road 1105 (FM 1105) in Williamson County, Texas, United States, thirty-three miles northeast of Austin. Walburg is a Texas German settlement named for the birthplace of one of its founders. With its heritage of buildings from the late 1890s, Walburg is a popular site for films, including Michael and The Texas Chain Saw Massacre 2.

Walburg also hosted filming for the motion picture Stars Over Henrietta.

Walburg is known for being a German farming community and has two Lutheran churches, one an LCMS congregation and one LCMC Congregation. Zion Lutheran (http://zionwalburg.org/) sits on a hill overlooking the community and hosts an Annual Wurstbraten which attracts and serves several thousand each year. St. Peter Lutheran is the other Lutheran Church in the immediate vicinity of Walburg.

Walburg previously had its own bank. Walburg State Bank, as it was once known, survived independently even through several national banking collapses and at least two bank robberies. It was sold in the early 1990s and closed its Walburg location.

Walburg is also home to two graveyards. Zion Lutheran's graveyard is right next to the church. The other graveyard is slightly farther down the road. This one contains a certain tree from which an alleged horse thief in the 1800s was hanged. It is often said that his ghost haunts the town.
