= Voyageurs (camp) =

French language and culture program in Minnesota, U.S.

Coordinates: 47°33′51″N 94°44′7″W

Voyageurs is a French language and culture program at the Concordia Language Villages based in northern Minnesota, United States. Recreating the life of the voyageurs, French fur traders of the 18th-century, campers cook over an open fire, bathe in the lake, and complete a grand voyage by canoe during the two- or four-week stay. All Concordia Language Villages programs are accredited by the American Camp Association.

== Location ==
The Voyageurs base camp is located on Turtle River Lake outside Bemidji, Minnesota, in the vicinity of other CLV language camps. In order to best imitate voyageurs life, there is no electricity or running water at the site. Campers sleep in tents organized into brigades and gather at the feu de camp for meals and activities. For a portion of the session, villagers are away from the base camp on the grand voyage canoe trip.

== Program content ==
Participants (called "villagers") learn and practice the French language in a historical and environmentally friendly context. Music, sports and games, clothes, and food are all rooted in Nouvelle France or Ojibwe traditions. French surrounds the villagers all day. Everything from putting on bug spray (antimoustique), singing traditional rowing songs, and learning about beadwork takes place entirely in the French language using techniques from the full Immersion language acquisition philosophy.

When villagers arrive at Voyageurs, they pick a new identity for themselves, including a traditional French voyageurs name. During their stay, the villagers will be known by this name and not their American one. They will live in brigades, groups of tents, named after major stopping points of the French fur trade: Montreal, Grand Portage, and the like. Immediately, villagers will begin canoe lessons to prepare them for the grand voyage, a week-long (in the case of two-week villagers) canoe trip simulating the voyage of the original voyageurs.

Both at base camp and during the grand voyage, songs and meals are key to the experience. Villagers learn to love Rubaboo, a pea soup concoction which, with enough garlic, keeps away the mosquitoes. Songs wake the villagers, pass the time during the day, keep rhythm during the long canoe trips, and lull the villagers to sleep at the end of the night, as well as creating a sense of community and cohesion among the villagers and staff.

As with all Concordia Language Villages, the Voyageurs mission is “to prepare young people for responsible citizenship in our global community”. It is structured around the values and practices of the CLVway, or the four precepts representing key attributes of responsible global citizenship: grand simulation, community-based learning, lived language and culture, and outdoor learning.

== Staff ==
All staff members at Voyageurs are at least bilingual in French and English, yet all activities are presented in French. Much of the staff are college students or full-time language teachers. Voyageurs staff come from all over the United States and the French-speaking world. They are responsible for the day-to-day running of the program, live in brigades with the villagers, and teach villagers during the daily small-group language lessons.

== Program Types ==
Middle school aged villagers stay for either a one-week or a two-week session.

High school aged villagers stay for either a two-week or four-week session. The four-week session may earn them the equivalent of one year of high school French. These intensive courses are conducted in a camp environment and the time is highly condensed. The credit program is accredited by AdvancED. All credit classes are conducted in French, even for beginners.

Families (any combination of adults and kids representing a family) can attend family camp sessions that include pre-school and adult classes.

Occasionally, one-week sessions are offered for adults at the very end of summer.
