= Liechtensteiner Americans =

Americans of Liechtensteiner birth or descent

Liechtensteiner Americans Liechtensteineramerikaner
Total population
- 1,244; 0.0004% of the U.S. population (2000)

Languages
- American English · German (Alemannic German)

Religion
- Roman Catholicism

Related ethnic groups
- German Americans

Liechtensteiner Americans (German: Liechtensteineramerikaner) are Americans of Liechtensteiner descent.

== History ==
The first recorded Liechtensteiner emigrants have immigrated to the United States in the early 1830s. However, the first great wave of Liechtensteiner emigrants arrived in the United States on April 7, 1851, settling in New Orleans; and in 1852 another group immigrated to Dubuque, Iowa (including stonemasons, bricklayers and carpenters). Eventually, many of the Liechtensteiner immigrants to Dubuque left that city and got farms nearby. However, the Liechtensteiner emigration was markedly reduced during the American Civil War (1861-1865). Later, when the construction of railroads began "tying the country together and opening up the West", other Liechtensteiners immigrated to the United States to work in the construction of railroads.

During the following decades, many other Liechtensteiners immigrated to places such as Guttenberg, Iowa and Wabash, Indiana. However, between 1885 and 1907, Liechtensteiner emigration was markedly reduced, limited to a few individuals and families. Less than 30 Liechtensteiners immigrated during that period to the United States. Reducing migration was due to the significant increase in economic activity derived from the establishment of the first textile factories in the 1880s.

World War I caused an economic crisis in Liechtenstein (which originated, among other things, because the Entente allies stopped the "import of raw materials" into the country and the "massive speculation by the national bank"), so the Liechtenstein immigration to the United States was retaken. Most of the new Liechtensteiner emigrants settled in urban areas, especially in Chicago and Hammond, Indiana, but there were Liechtensteiners throughout the country.

After World War II, a few more Liechtensteiners immigrated to the United States, the largest number arriving in 1948, when fifteen individuals or families immigrated. The reduction of the Liechtenstein emigration was due to improvements in the economic conditions of Liechtenstein.

== Notable people ==
- John Latenser Sr. (1858–1936), an American architect whose influential public works in Omaha, Nebraska
- Rainer Nägele (1943–2022), an American literary scholar

== See also ==
- Liechtenstein–United States relations
