= Mohammed Shaaban =

Qatari footballer (born 1993)

Personal information
- Full name: Mohammed Shaaban Mohammed Barakat
- Date of birth: 1 September 1993 (age 33)
- Place of birth: Egypt
- Position: Midfielder

Senior career*
Years	Team	Apps	(Gls)
2012–2015	Al-Sailiya	7	(0)
2015–2017	Al Arabi	33	(0)
2017–2018	Al-Markhiya	18	(0)
2018–2019	Al-Khor	11	(0)
2019–2020	Al-Shamal	-	(-)
2020–2022	Al-Kharaitiyat	-	(-)
2022–2023	Al Bidda	16	(0)
2024–2026	Lusail	12	(0)
- * Club domestic league appearances and goals

Mohammed Shaaban (Arabic: محمد شعبان) (born 1 September 1993) is a Qatari footballer. He currently plays as a midfielder.
