= Waldsee (camp) =

German language program in Minnesota, United States

Waldsee ("Lake of the Woods") is the German immersion program offered by Concordia Language Villages. Located near Bemidji, Minnesota, Waldsee is also the site of North America's first certified passive house, which uses 85% less energy than a house built to the Minnesota Energy Code.

Waldsee is America's oldest and largest immersion program for German language and culture. Over 1,550 young people participate yearly, coming together from all 50 of the United States and many foreign countries. In 2009 Waldsee was recognized as a U.S. National Center of Excellence for its cultural immersion program by the American Association of Teachers of German.

== History ==
Waldsee was the brainchild of professors Gerald Haukebo and Erhard Friedrichsmeyer at Concordia College in Moorhead, Minnesota, USA. In 1961, the first two-week session of "Camp Waldsee" was held for 72 villagers. The tuition was $75 and Erhard Friedrichsmeyer served as the dean of the program. Over the next decade, Waldsee began to grow in both the number of villagers attending as well as the number of weeks that the camp ran each summer. Waldsee's first "adventure program," Alpenland, was held at the Rising Wolf Ranch in Montana, where villagers learned German while enjoying hikes in the mountains and horseback riding.

In 1970, the high school credit program was launched, providing a four-week intensive instruction for high-school students equivalent to a full year's instruction in a traditional classroom. In 1973, Waldsee launched its first study abroad program, offering backpacking and biking trips to Germany, Austria, and Switzerland.

In the early 1980s, the permanent Waldsee site began to be built on Turtle River Lake, near Bemidji, Minnesota.

In 2010, Waldsee celebrated its 50th anniversary. Events in 2010 included a major "Waldseefest" on July 24, 2010 and six different alumni weekends.

=== World connections ===
Waldsee enjoys a continuing sister city relationship with the German town of Bad Waldsee, located in Baden-Württemberg.

Horst Köhler, the former President of the Federal Republic of Germany, was the official patron (Schirmherr) of Waldsee, as was his predecessor, Roman Herzog. Many German Ambassadors and other dignitaries have visited Waldsee. World leaders have endorsed Concordia Language Villages, notably former United Nations Secretary-General Kofi Annan, and former U.S. President Bill Clinton, whose daughter Chelsea attended Waldsee for six summers.

==== Notable Past Villagers and Counselors ====
- Chelsea Clinton
- William Lee Scott
- Emma Hitchcock

=== Waldsee deans ===
Years	Dean	Site
1961–1962	Erhard Friedrichsmeyer	Alexandria (Luther Crest Camp)
1963–1965, 1968–1969	Hedi Oplesch	"
1966	Norbert Benzel	"
1967	Dale Whitesides	"
1968–1969	Kerry Koestler	"
1970–1979	Bill "Dieter" Schleppergrell	Alexandria (Luther Crest Camp); Cass Lake (Camp Minne-Wa-Kan); Menagha (Camp Emmaus)
1980–1983	JoAnn "Hanna" Tiedemann	Vergas (Camp Trowbridge); Bemidji
1981-2021	Dan "Karl" Hamilton	Vergas (Camp Trowbridge); Bemidji
1983–1987	Andrew "Gustav" Staab	Bemidji
1988–2000	Erin "Ilse" Jennings	Cass Lake (Camp Minne-Wa-Kan); Hackensack (Camp Patmos); Bemidji
1995–2006	Carl-Martin Nelson	Cass Lake (Camp Minne-Wa-Kan); Vergas (Camp Trowbridge); Bemidji
2001-	Jon "Berndt" Olsen	Vergas (Camp Trowbridge); Bemidji, MN
2022	Justin "Julius" Quam and Heidi "Julia" Draheim-Shadbeh	Bemidji, MN
2023-	Angela "Johanna" Schneider	Bemidji, MN

Waldsee offers one-, two- and four-week living and learning experiences in German language and culture for beginning through advanced 7- to 18-year-olds.

The German Language Village has been cited as a model of innovative education by a wide variety of educators and organizations, including the American Association of Teachers of German and the Goethe Institut Inter Nationes. It has also been featured in such media as Frankfurter Allgemeine Zeitung, Basler Zeitung, ZDF German Television, CBS American Television, The New York Times, Time, German Life Magazine, Oskar's and Deutschland magazines, and been the subject of award-winning journalistic essays and various doctoral dissertations.

=== Daily life ===
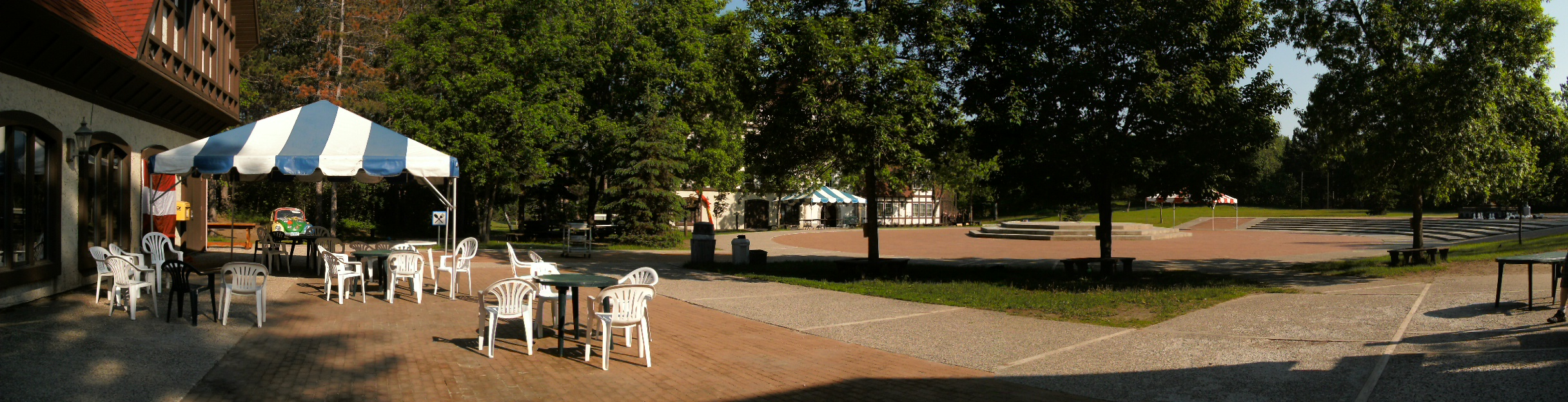
Waldsee Marktplatz. The Gasthof dining hall can be seen at left, and the Bahnhof is in the background.

Waldsee offers programs that serve youth (7–18 years old), families of all ages, and adults; one of the high school credit programs travels abroad. During the academic year, Waldsee also hosts school groups.

The Waldsee credit program offers traditional instruction as well as credit programs in environmental learning and German (die Grüne Welle) and in medieval history and theater (der Märchenwald). In the German apprentice program, starting in 2010, participants work half-time in the village stores, in gardening and green roof maintenance, music, the arts and the kitchen and bakery, and also learn half-time in intensive German language groups.

Waldsee's non-credit programs include programs that focus on producing FM radio broadcasts at a live radio station, learning about Swiss culture in tandem with the nearby French village Lac du Bois and the Italian village Lago del Bosco, learning about the environment, performing improvisational theater based on medieval lore and legends, and exploring German grammar in depth.

Villagers can choose different activities every day. Waldsee offers a wide range of European sports from soccer to fencing. There is also traditional American camp activities such as swimming and canoeing at the beach. Waldsee also has a few giant chess sets and a giant Mühle (nine men's morris) game.

=== Locations ===
Waldsee is currently located at a culturally authentic site on Turtle River Lake north of Bemidji, Minnesota. Since its founding in 1961, Waldsee has also leased numerous sites across Minnesota. It also offers a credit program that travels abroad.

==== Permanent site ====
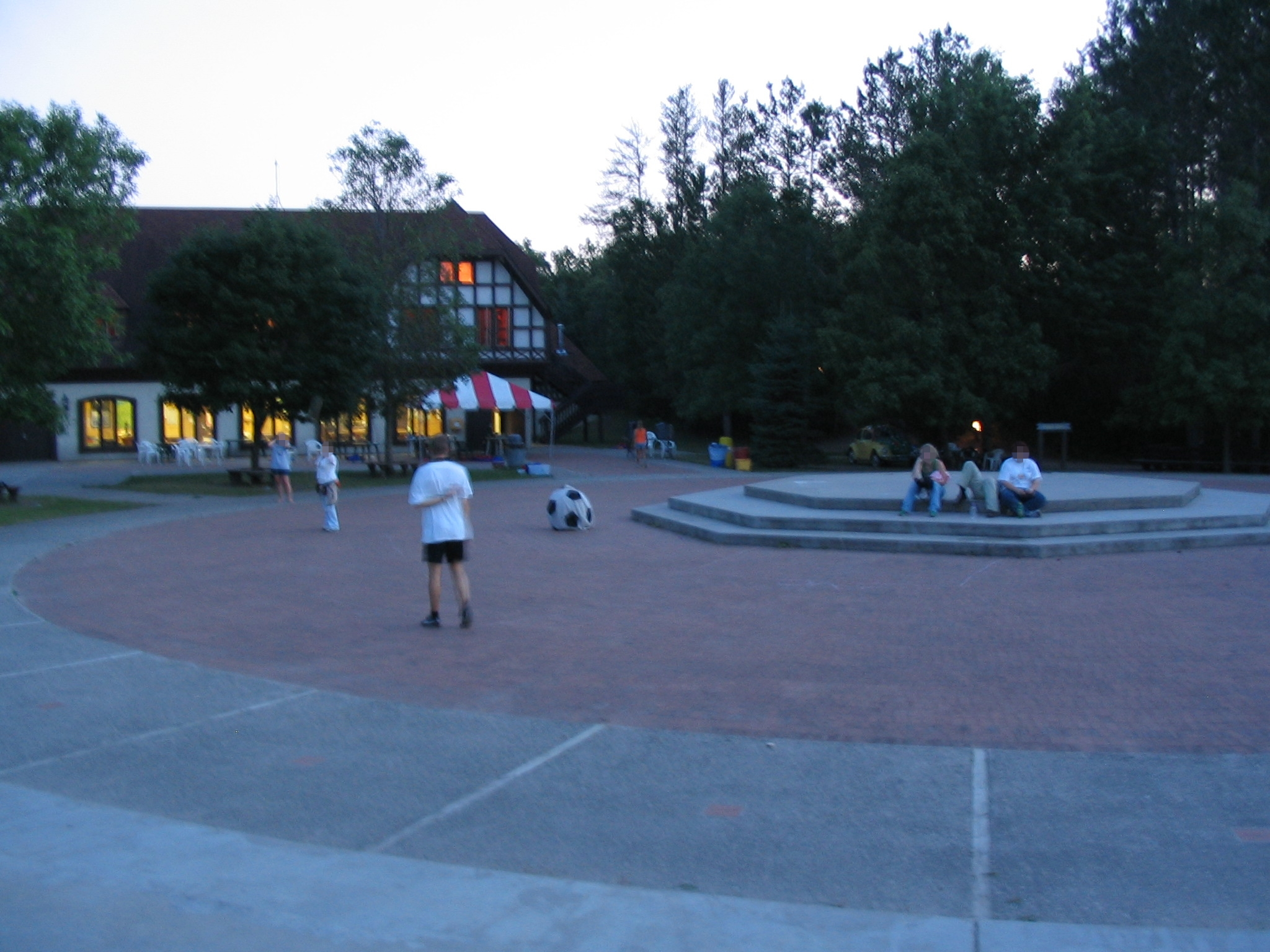
Waldsee Marktplatz near Bemidji, Minnesota. The culturally authentic Gasthof dining hall can be seen in the background.

The Waldsee permanent site, which opened in 1982, is located at 47°33′33.78″N 94°44′19.36″W near Bemidji, Minnesota on Turtle River Lake, along with six other Concordia Language Village sites. In all, Waldsee can house up to 240 people (typically, there are about 170 students and 40-50 counselors).

The site is styled after a typical German village and is centered around a Marktplatz, which is the center of most activity at Waldsee. The Bahnhof is a large building near the entrance of the village that houses class and administrative rooms. The Gasthof is another building that serves as a dining hall and houses most indoor activities. There is an artists' colony, named Worpswede, which has about 6 small cabins and houses the arts and crafts activities.

The first building on the campsite was "Haus Katja", which is a log cabin that was built by a group of villagers. The first professionally built building was the Schwarzwaldhaus or Black Forest house, which can house 64 people in four units as well as several more in separate sleeping rooms on the first floor. A twin to the Schwarzwaldhaus is the Max Kade Haus, which was built a few years after the SWH and is very similar in design.

Two new medium-sized residences have been recently built. The Erich Markel Haus (Oberammergau and Unterammergau) has room for 24 people in two units. The Robert Bosch Haus houses the healthcare center (Heilbronn) and another residence (Stuttgart). The newest building at Waldsee is the BioHaus, the first certified passive house in North America. The BioHaus is an integrated environmental learning center and residence for up to 30 people, including a small apartment upstairs. There is also Café Einbeck, where villagers can sample candy, soft drinks, and other foods from Europe or listen to a jukebox playing German-language music. Waldsee also has a Laden at which villagers can make purchases using Euro.

==== Leased sites ====
Waldsee has also operated at leased sites since its founding in 1961. Waldsee has been located in Alexandria, Minnesota, Vergas, Minnesota, Menagha, Minnesota, Hackensack, Minnesota, and Cass Lake, Minnesota. Waldsee departed from Vergas in the summer of 2006 to make room for Al-Wāḥa, the Arabic language village, which was founded that year.

==== Abroad ====
Waldsee travels abroad to Germany, Austria, and Switzerland with smaller groups of high school students studying German in their summer for credit.

== BioHaus (Passive House) ==
In 2006, Waldsee opened the BioHaus, the first certified passive house in North America, on its permanent site near Bemidji, Minnesota. It is built to the German passive house standard for energy conservation and renewable energy use, and uses 85% less energy than a house built to the Minnesota Energy Code.

The construction of the BioHaus was funded in part through a grant from the Deutsche Bundesstiftung Umwelt (DBU), which is the world's largest foundation dedicated to environmental practice, education and construction. The Waldsee passive house marked the first time that DBU had awarded such a grant in North America.

In 2007, the BioHaus won the Minnesota Environmental Initiative Award in the category of Air Quality and Climate Protection. It was a 2007 Nominee for the World Clean Energy Award in the construction category.

=== Cultural importance ===
The fixtures are German, and the house helps to introduce students to the "new Germany" as well as preparing them for responsible and ecological citizenship in the global community, the mission of Concordia Language Villages. The modern house itself pays homage to the Bauhaus school of 1920s architecture, and floor-to-ceiling windows recall the symbolic transparency built into West German government buildings post-World War II.

=== Design ===
The house was built using eight critical design strategies: Passive Solar Design, Superinsulation, Advanced Window Technology, Airtightness, Ventilation, Space Heating, Efficient Lighting and Electrical appliances.

The building replaces 100% outside air; no air is recirculated through the system. Two underground tubes exchange outside and inside air eight feet beneath the ground, passively warming or cooling the air to match the temperature of the ground (~55 °F year round). The house transfers heat between the outgoing air and the incoming air before it reaches the rooms, resulting in a difference of less than 10 °F between the incoming fresh air and the desired room temperature, even in the midst of Minnesotan winter.

Water in the house is heated by solar thermal heat panels on the roof, rather than photovoltaic solar cells, which would convert solar energy directly to electricity.

Low-growing plants make up the building's green roof, reducing rainwater runoff and adding another layer of insulation to the building. Additionally, the western half of the lower level of the structure is tucked into the slope, enabling natural insulation based on the soil.

== See also ==
- Passive house
