= Muhammad Shaaban =

Egyptian diplomat (born 1942)

Muhammad Shaaban (born 13 June 1942) is a career Egyptian diplomat who served as the United Nations Under-Secretary-General for General Assembly and Conference Management, until July 2012. He was appointed to the position by United Nations Secretary-General Ban Ki-moon in February 2007.

Shaaban has acquired extensive knowledge about the United Nations. From 1984 to 1988, he served as Egypt's representative to the Second Committee of the United Nations Economic and Social Council, the United Nations Development Programme (UNDP), and several intergovernmental bodies and committees. Between 1985 and 1986, he acted as the Coordinator of the "Group of 77" developing countries and China.

A seasoned diplomat, Shaaban served his government in various diplomatic capacities. From 1993 to 1997, he was Ambassador to Belgium and Luxembourg and Head of Egypt's Permanent Mission to the European Union in Brussels. In the following year, he served as Assistant Foreign Minister for African Affairs. Between 1998 and 2000, he was Ambassador to Denmark and Lithuania. From 2000 to 2001, he was Assistant Minister for Information, Research and Assessment and National Coordinator for Information, Research and Assessment. In the following three years, he served as Assistant Foreign Minister for European Affairs.

Shaaban has been National Coordinator for Reform Initiatives in the Middle East since 2004. In this capacity, he maintained relations with his foreign partners and coordinated with various departments in the Egyptian government as well as political parties and civil society. He also advised the Foreign Minister on various issues.

He obtained his Ph.D. in political science and his Master of Arts in international relations from Brussels University and since 2002 has been a visiting lecturer at the Diplomatic Academy of London at the University of Westminster. He speaks fluent English and French and has fair knowledge of Portuguese and Spanish.
