= Skogfjorden =

Norwegian language village and campsite

- Language village and campsite
- Skogfjorden Norwegian Language Village
- Interactive map of Skogfjorden
- Coordinates: 47°33′06″N 94°43′50″W
- Country: United States United States
- State: Minnesota Minnesota
- County: Beltrami
- Time zone: UTC-6 (Central (CST))
  - Summer (DST): UTC-5 (Central (CDT))
- Website: Skogfjorden - Concordia Language Villages

Skogfjorden is a Norwegian language village and campsite affiliated with the Concordia Language Villages. It is located at the Concordia site at Turtle River Lake near Bemidji, Minnesota, United States. Skogfjorden is a village for language immersion where American villagers come to live and experience Norwegian language and culture.

== Skogfjorden promise ==
The staff of Skogfjorden make this promise to the villagers and to one another.

I am responsible and accountable for establishing and maintaining our vibrant Skogfjorden community, where:

- Everyone is and feels safe;
- Everyone belongs;
- Norwegian is at the heart of everything we do;
- Connections to Norway are affirmed, refreshed, and expanded; and
- Teamwork is built upon individual contributions.

== International recognition ==
The Ambassador of Norway, Knut Vollebæk, visited the village in 2003.

His Majesty King Harald V of Norway has granted royal patronage to Skogfjorden. Patronage is an affirmation from the Royal Family of Norway of the quality educational programming of Concordia Language Villages.

In 2009, Tove I. Dahl, the dean of Skogfjorden, was named a Knight of the First Class of the Royal Norwegian Order of Merit, by His Majesty King Harald V of Norway, for the advancement of Norwegian language and culture in the United States. Dahl is a professor of educational psychology at the University of Tromsø and is married to Curt Rice.

== History ==
Concordia Language Villages began offering Norwegian programs in 1963 and opened an architecturally-authentic, year-round Norwegian Language Village on Turtle River Lake near Bemidji, Minnesota in 1971.
