= Space Camp (disambiguation) =

Space Camp is an educational camp in Alabama.

Space Camp may also refer to:

== Educational camps ==
- Biosphere 2, in Arizona
- Cosmodome, in Canada
- European Space Camp, in Norway
- Euro Space Center, in Belgium
- Space Camp Turkey
- Camps held at the former Space World in Japan
- Summer camps with a focus on space science; see List of summer camps

== Films, music & video game ==
- SpaceCamp, a 1986 adventure film
  - SpaceCamp (soundtrack), the soundtrack album for the film
- Space Camp, an album by Audio Karate
- Space Camp (video game), a 2009 video game published by Activision
