= Lisbet =

Lisbet is a given name. Notable people with the given name include:

- Lisbet Bryske (1585–1674), Danish author and landowner
- Lisbet Dæhlin (1922–2012), Danish-born Norwegian ceramist
- Lisbet Dahl (born 1946), Danish actress
- Lisbet Hindsgaul (1890–1969), Danish politician, women's rights activist and parliamentary auditor
- Lisbet Holtedahl (born 1946), Danish-born Norwegian social anthropologist and film producer
- Lisbet Jagedal (born 1964), Swedish singer
- Lisbet Jakobsen (born 1987), Danish rower
- Lisbet Kolding (born 1965), Danish footballer
- Lisbet Lundquist (born 1943), Danish actress
- Lisbet Rausing (born 1960), Swedish philanthropist and historian of science
- Lisbet Rugtvedt (born 1967), Norwegian politician
- Lisbet Stuer-Lauridsen (born 1968), Danish badminton player
