= Norwegian Institute for Water Research =

Norwegian research institute

The Norwegian Institute for Water Research (NIVA) is an environmental research organisation which researches, monitors, assesses and studies freshwater, coastal and marine environments and environmental technology.

== Services and research ==
NIVA's areas of work include environmental contaminants, biodiversity and climate related issues. NIVA's research reports can be accessed through BIBSYS, and all reports from 1956 until 2015 are available for download. Some of the more widely read articles are also made available by Sciencenordic.com and forskning.no (articles in Norwegian only). The institute has twelve sections, led by research managers: Aquaculture, Biodiversity, Innovation, International projects and cooperation, Chemicals, Effects of climate change, Laboratory services, Environmental contaminants, Environmental monitoring, Environmental technology and Measures against pollution.

In 2012 NIVA was in the news after its scientists developed a method of studying drug use in cities though analysis of sewage.

== Organisation ==
NIVA was founded in 1958 and in 2015 is a non-profit research foundation. Its board is appointed by the Norwegian Ministry of the Environment, the Research Council of Norway and its employees. NIVA's Head Office is at the Oslo Innovation Centre in Oslo, with regional offices in Bergen, Grimstad and Hamar, as well as a large scale research facility in the Oslo Fjord. The organization is certified with ISO9001, and laboratory activities are accredited in accordance with ISO17025.

NIVA has about 200 employees. Two-thirds of these have educational backgrounds in water sciences and more than half work in research.

== Subsidiaries ==
NIVA has several wholly and partly owned subsidiaries:

- Akvaplan-niva AS is a research and consultancy firm in the fields of aquaculture, marine biology and freshwater biology. The company offers services related to environmental contaminants, biology, oceanography, chemistry and geology. Akvaplan-niva was founded in 1984 and is located at the Fram Centre in Tromsø. The company is wholly owned by NIVA.
- AquaBiota Water Research AB is NIVA's subsidiary in Sweden. The company uses geographical information systems (GIS) to analyse and model biological and oceanographic phenomena. Around half of AquaBiota's business involves basic research; the other half consists of projects for government agencies and industry in Sweden and internationally.
- BallastTech-NIVA AS was one of the first companies in the world to establish a full-scale centre for land-based testing of equipment for the treatment of ballast water in accordance with the International Maritime Organization (IMO). The testing centre is located at NIVA's marine research station at Solbergstrand, 20 kilometres (12 mi) from Oslo. BallastTech-NIVA AS is a wholly owned subsidiary of NIVA-tech AS.
- NIVA Chile SA is owned 50% by NIVA and 50% by NIVA-tech AS. The organisation's primary focus is to provide advice about water-quality and -treatment to the Chilean aquaculture industry.
- NIVA-tech AS works with commercial applications for NIVA's competence, services, products and technology.
- NIVA China conducts research and development on environmental challenges in China.
