= Træen =

Træen is a surname. Notable people with the surname include:

- Bente Træen (1958–2023), Norwegian dentist and sexologist
- Jørgen Træen (born 1973), Norwegian record producer, musician and electronica artist
- Torstein Træen (born 1995), Norwegian racing cyclist
