= Space Camp Spain =

Space Camp Spain (also known as Space Camp Catalonia) is the only summer camp devoted for youths aged 7–12 in Spain hosted at Vilanova i la Geltrú. Participants are from all over Spain and official languages are Spanish and English.

There are other space or science-related camps for older young people, it is specially relevant the one organized by the Instituto Nacional de Técnica Aeroespacial (Aerospace Technology Institute of Spain).

The Space Camp Initiative is not unique and exist in other countries the most relevant are the United States Space Camp and European Space Camp in Norway. Longer list of Space Camps can be found at list of summer camps.

== Objectives ==
Provide a place for the kids to experiment and learn about the implications of living in Space and how that knowledge they achieve can help them here on earth. Values as tolerance and respect are taught, as well as the technological benefits from space technology ( E.g. Solar Cells, Water Purification Systems or Air Purification Systems )

The International Space Station is used as reference for the Space Camp not only or being one of the largest scientific and technological projects in history but also because it is an example of overcoming difficulties (international, intercultural, becoming then a great example for the youth.

== Educational Approach ==
Space Camp Education program assumes the following hypothesis: the youths best learn if they need/want it for their entertainment, survival or compression of the environment. In other words, when they create their own interest toward the issue. So instead of forcing them to absorb lectures and lectures of knowledge and facts given by monitors, the monitors spend most of the time explaining the basic environment of the game of living in the Space, at this point the kids are themselves in order to feel the experience as real as much as possible and they start asking and learning how the technology, science, medicine and space vehicle should be.

== Contents Astronaut Training ==
Space Camp Spain focuses on giving a hands-on experience into the field of aerospace engineering, launch vehicles, Space medicine and other space related disciplines. During the space camp the kids learn from professionals and becoming amateur rocket scientists and learning how astronauts live and work in space. The activities at the camp include experimentation, mock-up fabrication, maths lectures, presentations and organization of their mission all content adequate to their age.

The goal of the camp is to simulate the astronaut training to teach the kids why science, engineering, human relations, and tolerance is important for their future and for living in a multicultural and multidisciplinar society.

== History ==
Space Camp Spain was initiated 2006 and after some time of organization and content creation the first space camp was in the summer of 2010. It was the university A3E Association of the Polytechnic University of Catalonia that initiated the idea of a summer camp with this particular approach of role playing the kids as astronauts; making them realize what they need to survive in such hard environment called Space. Later in 2010 the International Space University Spanish Alumni association joint efforts and expertise to make the project real.

== Staff & People Involved ==
=== Direction ===
- Clara Salido,(Founder)
- Xavier Alabart,(Founder)

=== Teachers & Monitors ===
- Meritxell Viñas,
- Gerard Gorostiza,
- Ismael Tejero,
- Marc Zaballa,
- Georgina Sanchez,
- Jesus Pablo Gonzalez, (Founder)
- Roc Maymó, (Founder)
- Miguel Octavio,
- Nuria Blanco Delgado

=== Assistants ===
- Jorge A. Soliz Torrico,
- Jose I. Rojas,
- Andrea Jaime Albalat

== Space Camp Media Coverage ==
=== TV ===
- Space Camp in TV Catalan Channel (Language Catalan) (Video)

=== Radio ===
- Space Camp in Spanish National Radio (Spanish) (Audio)

=== Press ===
- Space Camp in EuropaPress Article (Spanish)

== See also ==
- Space Camp Turkey
- European Space Camp
- Space Camp (United States)
