= Terje Tvedt =

Norwegian professor, author and documentary film maker

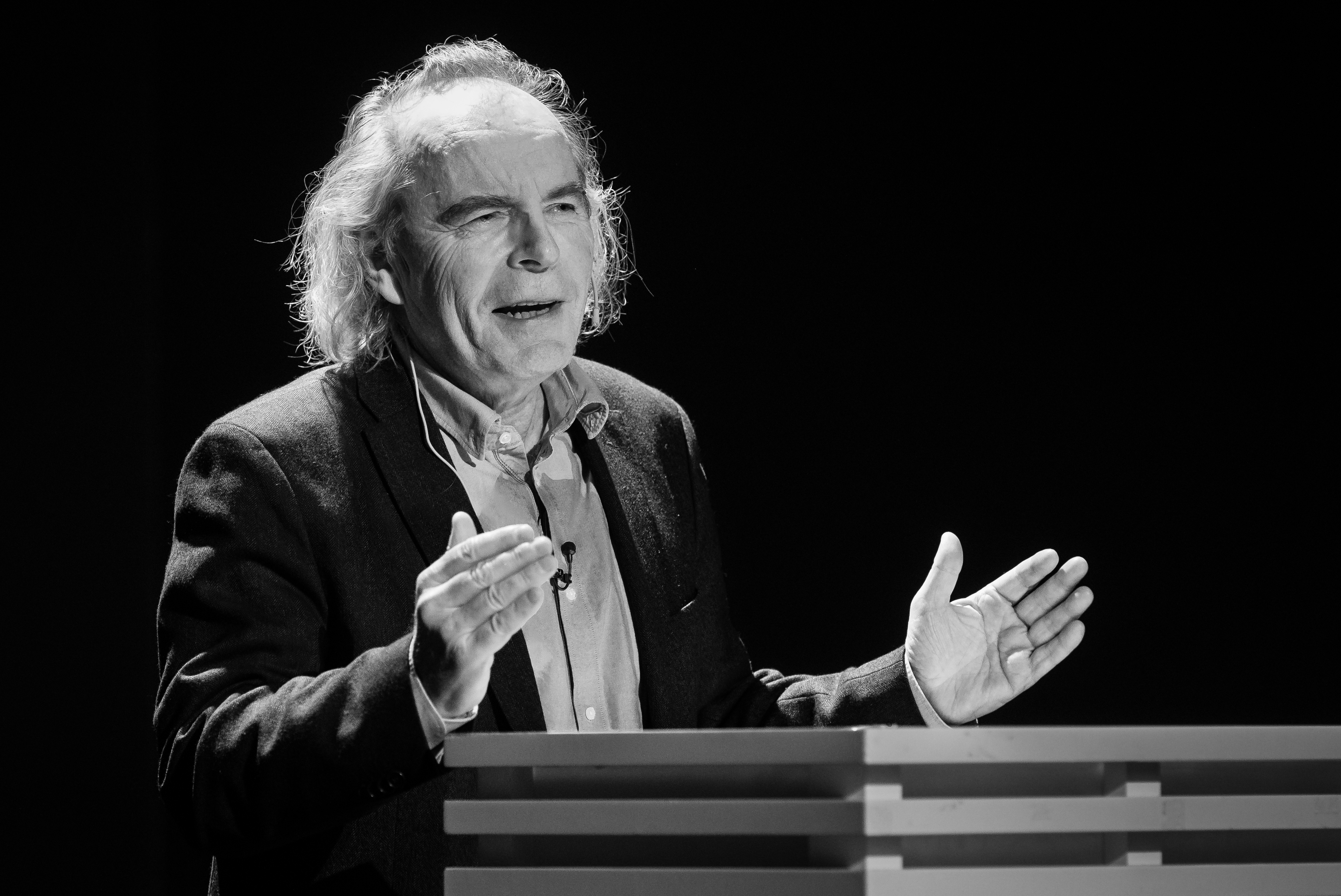
- Born: 24 August 1951; Stavanger
- Alma mater: University of Bergen; University of Bergen
- Occupation: University teacher
- Employer: Chr. Michelsen Institute (1987–1990); Norwegian Academy of Science and Letters (2009–2010); University of Bergen (2001–); University of Cambridge (2013–2014); University of Oslo (2012–)

Terje Tvedt (born 24 August 1951) is a Norwegian academic, author and documentary film maker.

Tvedt is presently a professor at the Department of Geography, University of Bergen, and Professor in Global History, University of Oslo, Norway. He has previously been a professor of political science and development studies.

== Career and work ==
Tvedt has published extensively on world history and water, colonial history and the international development aid system. He has also written on the Norwegian modern history of ideas with an emphasis on dominant worldviews in the era of development aid. His books on Norwegian history has created very much discussions and public interest in Norway. His books have been translated into a number of languages, as Arabic, Chinese, Danish, Dutch, English, German, Italian, Serbian, Swedish, and Ukrainian.

Tvedt has written and presented a number of award-winning TV-documentaries shown all over the world. 'A Journey in the History of Water'. This film won the first prize as the best environmental documentary in the world in 1998, see, The Future of Water, and The Nile Quest deal with world history and water. His other documentaries deal with development aid and the international aid system (in Norwegian). The films have been bought by networks like National Geographic, Discovery, Al Jazeera, Al Arabiya, Documentary channel and Netflix. See the YouTube channel on Water and World History.

== Awards ==
Tvedt has received several awards for his research, such as the Research Council of Norway's Award for Excellence in Communication of Science, the Article of the Year – The Scandinavian University Press Academic Journal Prize and the Fritt Ord Prize.

== Bibliography ==
Selected non-Norwegian book titles:

- Tvedt, Terje, The Nile. History's Greatest River, London: IB Tauris/Bloomsbury, 2021.
- Tvedt, Terje, Water and Society. Changing Perspectives of Societal and Historical Development. London: IB Tauris/Bloomsbury, 2021.
- Tvedt, Terje. Der Nil. Fluss der Geschichte, Berlin: Links, 2021
- Tvedt, Terje, Series Editor, A History of Water, (12 volumes, 3 series) London: IB Tauris, 2006-2016).
- Tvedt, Terje and Terje Oestigaard, T. (eds). A History of Water: Series III : Vol. III: 'Water and Food – From hunter-gatherers to global production in Africa. (Series Editor, Terje Tvedt), London: IB Tauris. ISBN 978-1-78076-871-7 2016.
- Tvedt, Terje, O. McIntyre, and T.K. Woldetsadik, T. K. (eds). A History of Water: Series III : Vol. II: Sovereignty and International Water Law. (Series Editor Terje Tvedt), London: IB Tauris (ISBN 978-1-78076-448-1)., 2015.
- Tvedt, Terje and Terje Oestigaard, T. (eds.) A History of Water: Series III : Vol. I: 'Water and Urbanization. (Series Editor, Terje Tvedt), London: IB Tauris (ISBN 978-1-78076-447-4), 2014
- Tvedt, Terje, A Journey in the Future of Water. I.B. Tauris, London/New York.2016.
- Tvedt, Terje, G. Chapman and R. Hagen (eds). A History of Water: Series II : Vol III: Water, Geopolitics and the New World Order. (Series Editor Terje Tvedt), London: I.B. Tauris (ISBN 978-1-84885-351-5). 2011.
- Tvedt, Terje and R. Coopey (eds.) (A History of Water: Series II : Vol. II: Rivers and Society: From early Civilizations to Modern Times. (Series Editor Terje Tvedt), London: Tauris. (ISBN 978-1-84885-350-8). 2011.
- Tvedt, Terje and T Oestigaard, (eds.) (2010). A History of Water: Series II : Vol. I: Ideas of Water From Ancient Societies to the Modern World. (Series Editor Terje Tvedt), London: I.B. Tauris 2010 (ISBN 978-1-84511-980-5). 2011.
- Tvedt, Terje (ed), The River Nile in the post-colonial Age: conflict and cooperation among the Nile Basin countries. London: IB Tauris (ISBN 978-1-84511-970-6). 2010.
- Opku-Mensah, Paul, David Lewis and Terje Tvedt (eds). Reconceptualising NGOs and their roles in Development: NGOs, Civil Society and the International Aid System. Aalborg: Aalborg Universitetsforlag. (ISBN 978-87-7307-799-3). 2007.
- Tvedt, Terje and Terje Østigård (Red): A History of Water: Series I : Vol. III: The World of Water. (Series editor Terje Tvedt), London: Tauris (ISBN 1-85043-447-6). 2006.
- Tvedt, Terje, The River Nile in the Age of the British. Political Ecology and the Quest for Economic Power. Cairo: The American University in Cairo Press (ISBN 977-416-046-0). (Re-published in paperback version in 2017, New York: Macmillan, London: IB. Tauris).
- Coopey, Richard and Terje Tvedt (eds) A History of Water: series I: Vol. II: The Political Economy of Water. (Series editor Terje Tvedt), London: Tauris. (ISBN 1-85043-446-8). 2006.
- Tvedt, Terje and E. Jakobsson (eds).A History of Water: series I: Vol. I: Water Control and River Biographies. (Series editor Terje Tvedt), London: Tauris (ISBN 1-85043-445-X), 2006.
- Tvedt, Terje, The River Nile in the Age of the British. Political Ecology and the Quest for Economic Power. London: Tauris. (ISBN 1-86064-835-5). (Translated into, and published in Arabic, Cairo 2018).
- Tvedt, Terje, The River Nile: An annotated bibliography. (2nd edition), London: IB Tauris. (ISBN 1-86064-879-7), 2004.
- Tvedt, Terje et al. Southern Sudan: An Annotated Bibliography (2 Vols.), London: Tauris (ISBN 1-86064-937-8). 2004.
- Tvedt, Terje, Angels of Mercy or Development Diplomats? NGOs & Aid. Oxford: James Currey Publishers (ISBN 0-85255-817-1). 1998.
- Sharif Harir and Terje Tvedt (eds). A short cut to decay: the case of the Sudan. Uppsala: Nordiske Afrikainstituttet, (ISBN 91-7106-346-3) (Republished in Arabic, Cairo 1996). 1994.
- Tvedt, Terje, (ed.) Conflicts in the Horn of Africa: human and ecological consequences of warfare (red). . Uppsala: EPOS, (ISBN 91-506-0972-6).1993.

== TV documentaries ==
Selected documentaries include:

- 2014: The Nile Quest, 3 episodes, (Norwegian Broadcasting Cooperation/Panopticon
- 2013: The Good Bombs, NRK Brennpunkt
- 2010: A Drop of Luxury, TV 2, Dokument 2
- 2007: The Future of Water, 3 episodes, TV2/Panopticon
- 1997: A Journey in the History of Water, 4 episodes, Nowegain Broadcasting Cooperation
