= Voting in space =

Voting whilst in space

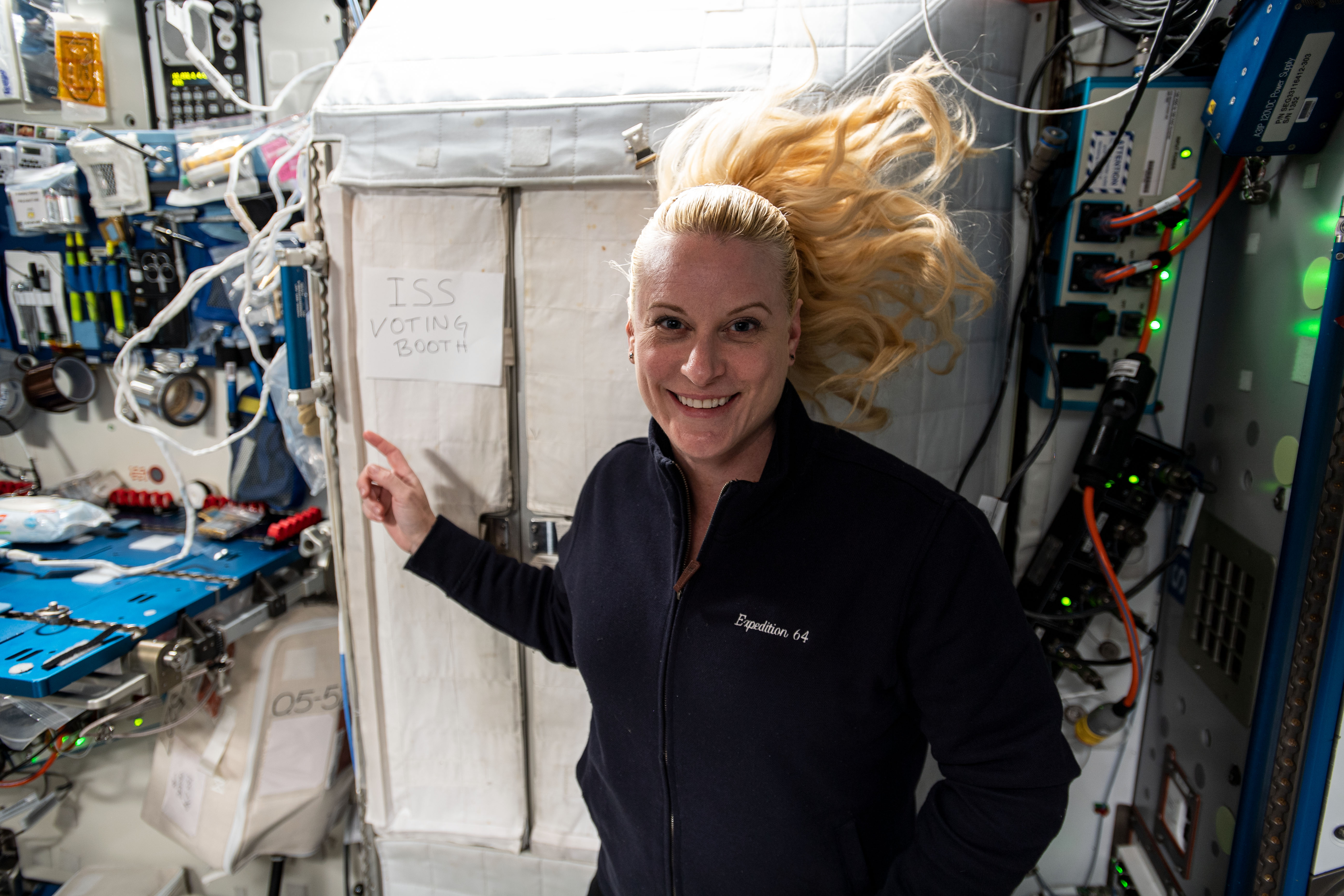
Two-time space voter Kathleen Rubins posing in front of a "voting booth" on the International Space Station, 2020

Many people have cast votes during spaceflight. Voting from space has some inherent difficulties, as delivering paper ballots to and from a space station—as one would do for a soldier stationed overseas—would be cost prohibitive. Some astronauts vote electronically, while others communicate their voting wishes to a proxy.

== United States ==
John Blaha, an astronaut stationed aboard the Mir space station, requested permission to vote in the 1996 presidential election. A NASA plan to allow Blaha to vote electronically was stopped when the Secretary of State of Texas pointed out that the state had no provision for any electronic voting. The following year, Governor George W. Bush signed a bill originally sponsored by Representative Mike Jackson, whose district included Johnson Space Center, that allowed astronauts to vote electronically. The first person to vote using this method was David Wolf, who voted in Houston's 1997 local elections while on board Mir.

Since 2004, astronauts on board the International Space Station (ISS) have voted in all but one presidential election. (Note: This includes 2004, 2008, 2016, and 2020. Two Americans—Sunita Williams and Kevin A. Ford—were on board the ISS during the 2012 election, but both had submitted absentee ballots prior to their spaceflight.) In order to vote while on board, astronauts must fill out the Federal Post Card Application prior to departure, the same application used by military members stationed overseas. During the election, Johnson Space Center transmits a secure electronic ballot, and the astronauts are emailed credentials by their local county clerk. The ballot is then filled out, downlinked to Earth, and e-mailed to the relevant county clerk. The first American to vote for president in space was Leroy Chiao in 2004 who was onboard the ISS in 2004. American astronaut Kathleen Rubins voted on the ISS on two occasions, in 2016 and 2020.

While most astronauts live in, and are registered to vote in, Texas, some are registered elsewhere in the country. Andrew R. Morgan, for instance, was registered to vote in Lawrence County, Pennsylvania; that county's Department of Voter Services collaborated with NASA to allow Morgan to vote in the 2019 local elections.

== USSR and Russia ==
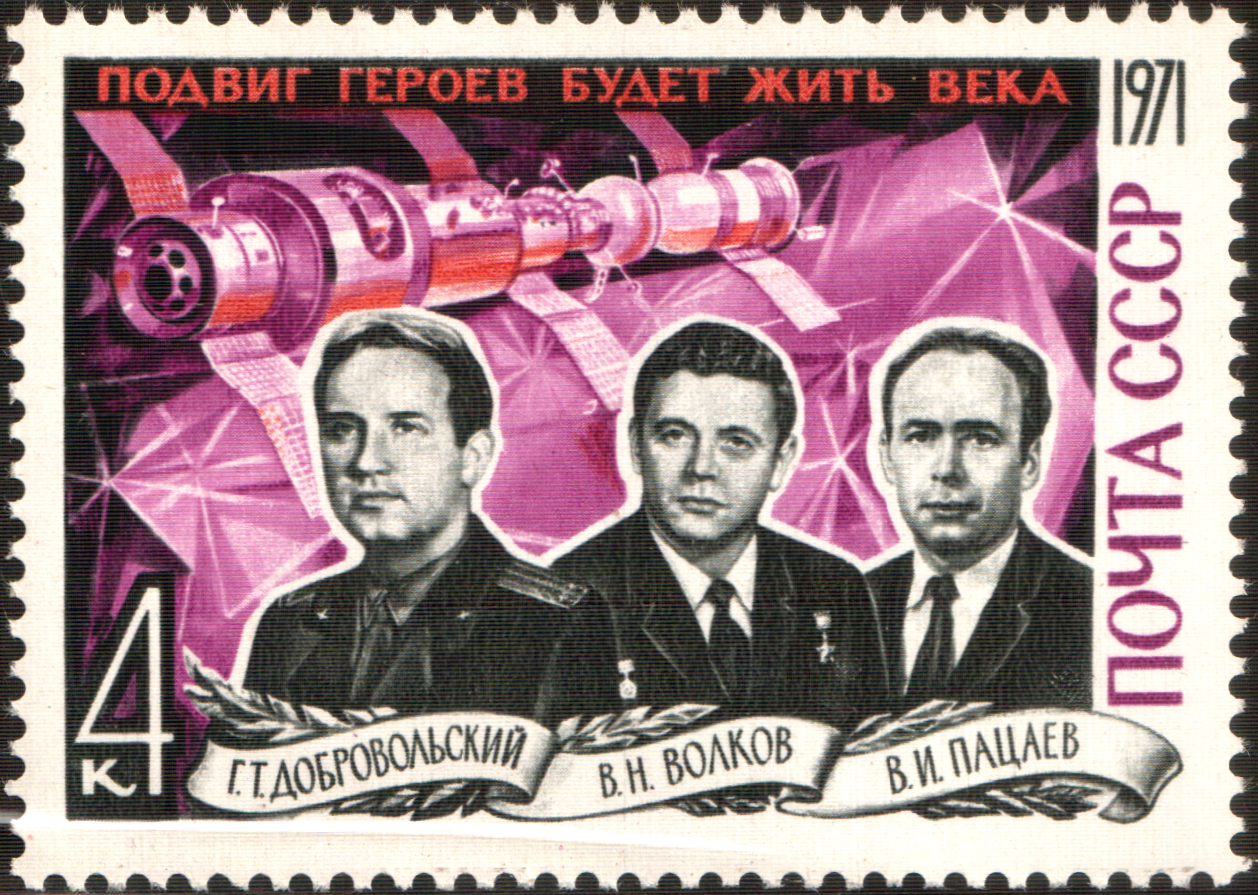
Stamp commemorating the Soyuz 11 crew, who died during flight back to Earth in 1971

In 1971, the crew of the Soyuz 11 (Georgy Dobrovolsky, Vladislav Volkov, and Viktor Patsayev) broadcast their votes from the Salyut 1 space station in the election for the 24th Congress of the Communist Party of the Soviet Union. A contemporary report from UPI stated that their votes were the first to be cast from space. Three cosmonauts (Sergei Krikalev, Valery Polyakov and Alexander Volkov) onboard the Mir space station voted in the 1989 Soviet parliamentary elections "without a secret ballot" with TASS reporting they announced their choice of candidates when communicating with ground control.

In Russia, cosmonauts generally vote by proxy; for example, in the 2011 legislative election, Anton Shkaplerov and Anatoli Ivanishin gave their vote to Cosmonaut Training Center employee Dmitry Zhukov.

During the 2020 Russian constitutional referendum, Moscow allowed for online voting. This allowed Anatoli Ivanishin, stationed on the ISS and registered to vote in Moscow, to vote electronically. Ivan Vagner, stationed alongside Ivanishin, voted by proxy.

== Other countries ==
=== France ===
French astronaut Thomas Pesquet voted from space in 2017.
