= Kathleen Rubins =

American microbiologist and NASA astronaut (born 1978)

Kate Rubins
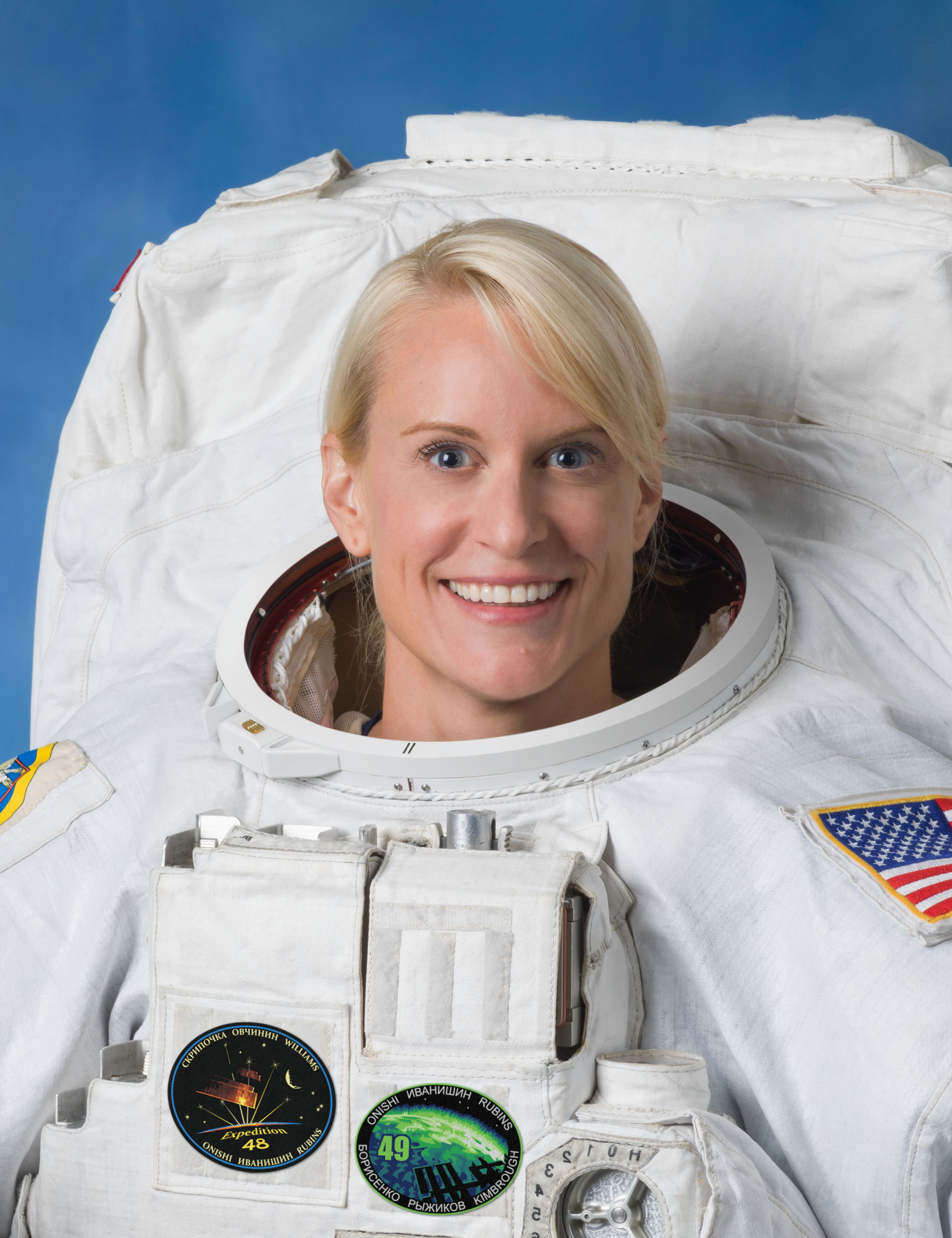
- Rubins in 2018
- Born: Kathleen Hallisey Rubins; October 14, 1978 (age 47); Farmington, Connecticut, U.S.
- Education: University of California, San Diego (BS); Stanford University (MS, PhD)
- Space career

NASA astronaut
- Time in space: 300 days, 1 hours, 31 minutes
- Selection: NASA Group 20 (2009)
- Total EVAs: 4
- Total EVA time: 26 hours, 46 minutes
- Missions: Soyuz MS-01 (Expedition 48/49); Soyuz MS-17 (Expedition 63/64)
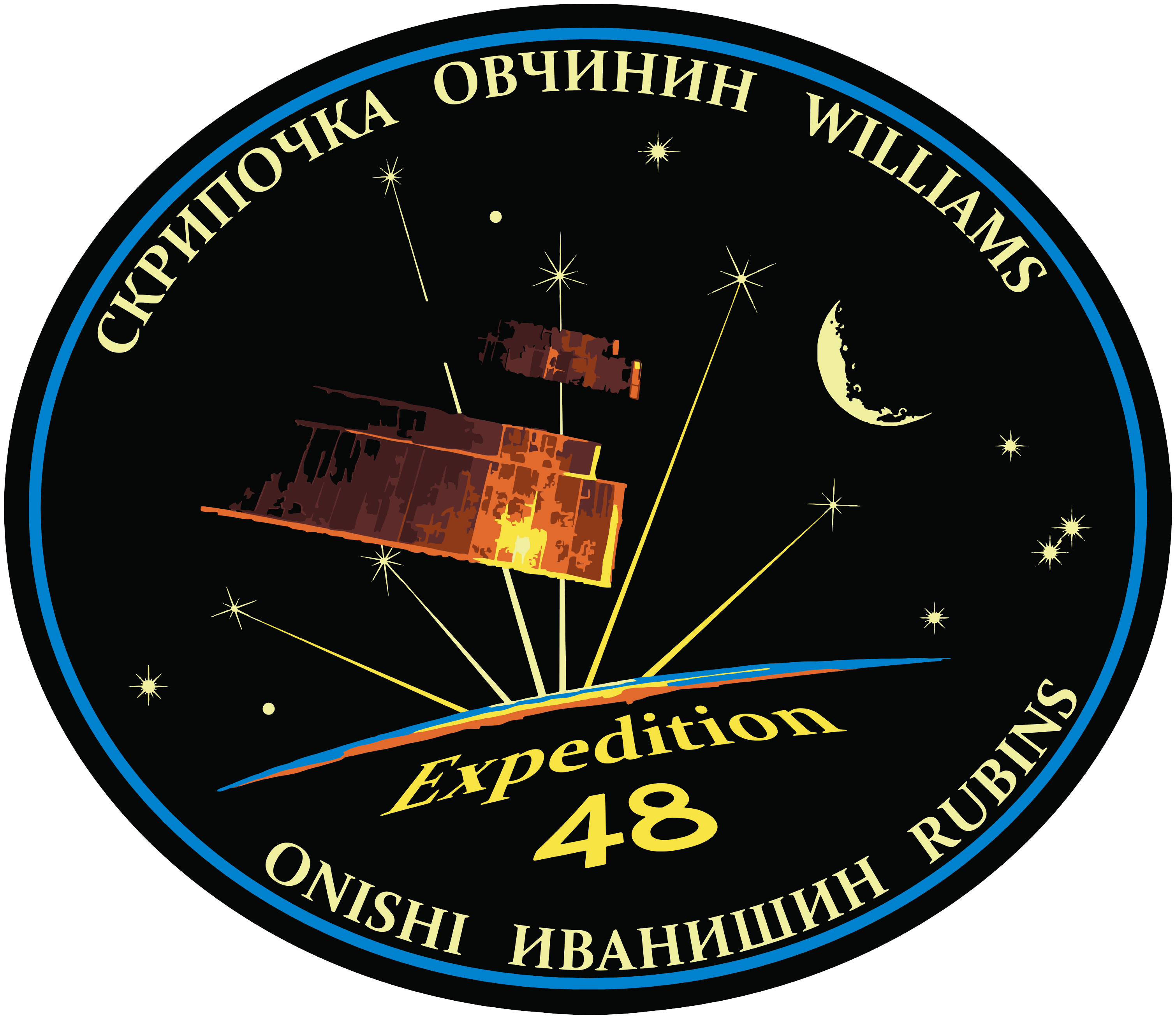
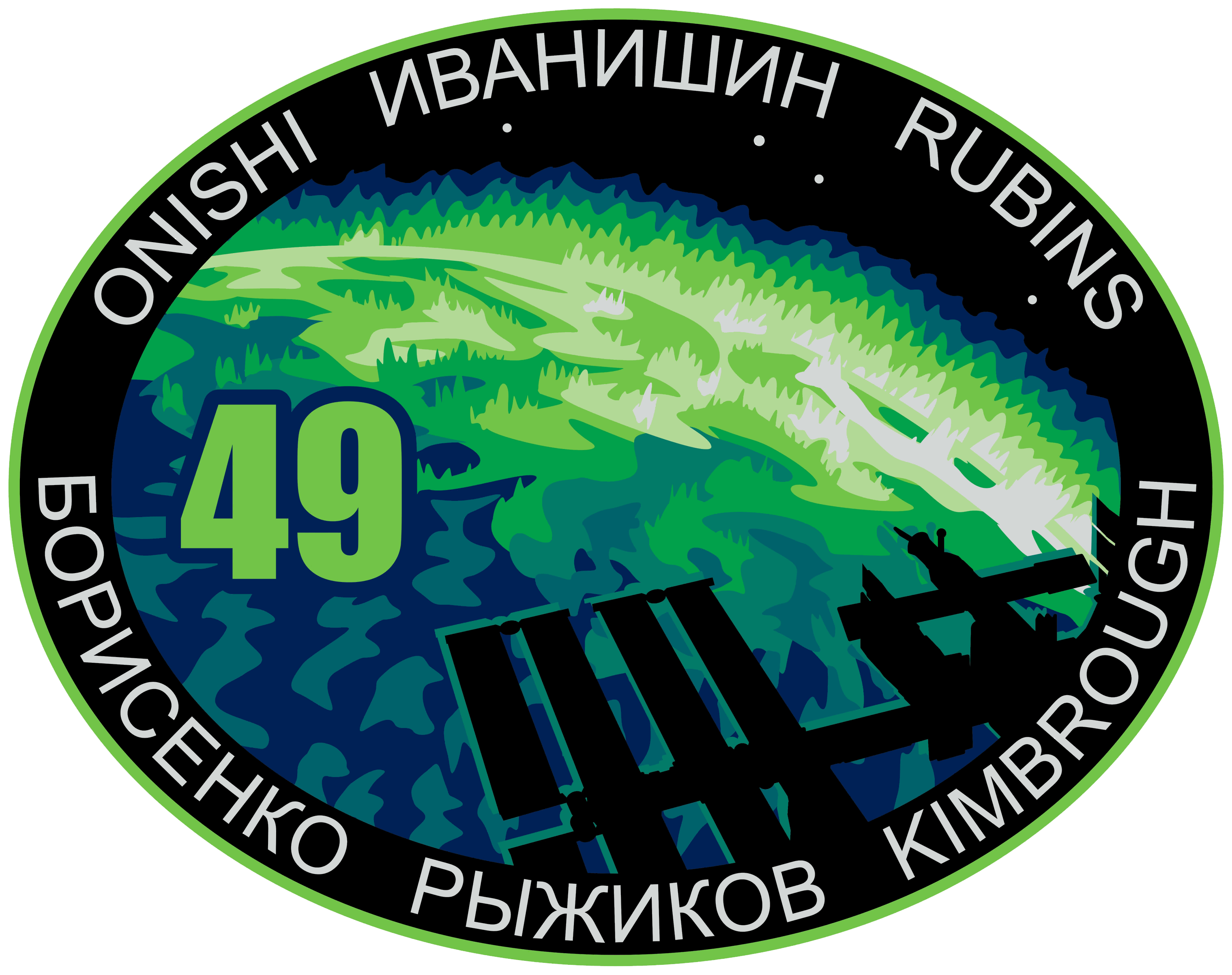
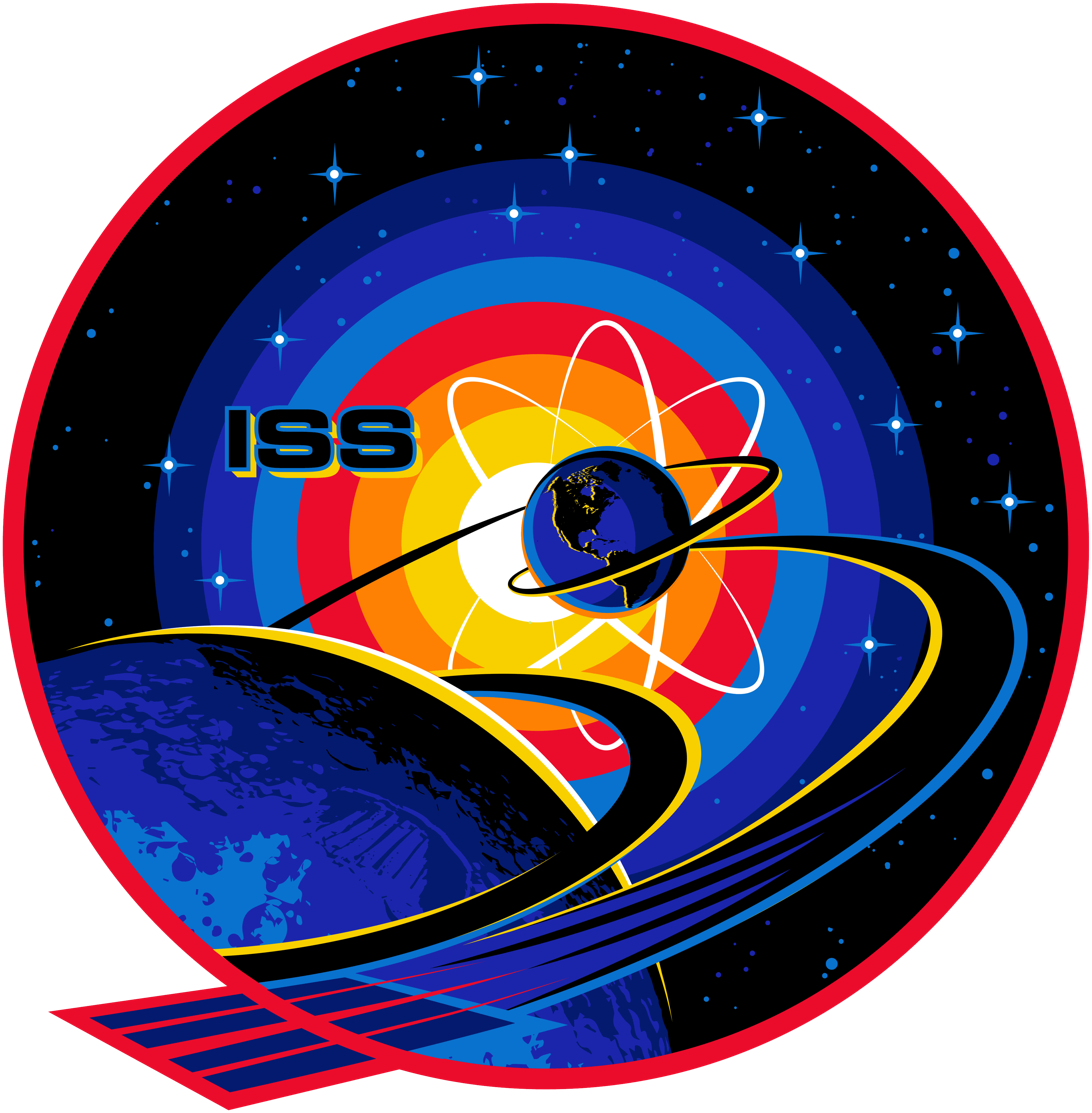
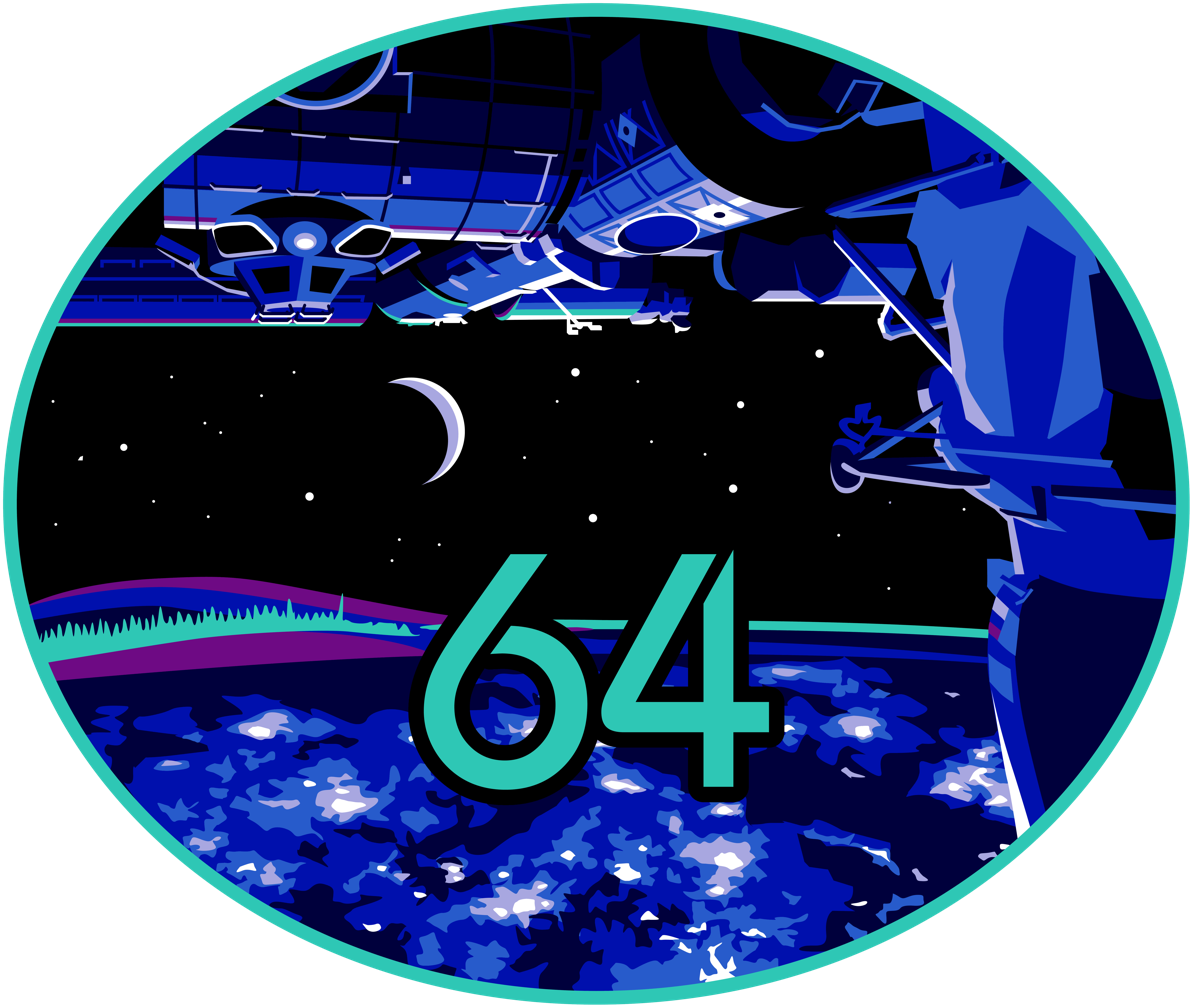
- Mission insignia
- Retired: July 28, 2025
- Scientific career
- Fields: Biochemistry
- Thesis: A Genome-Wide Analysis of the Host and Viral Responses during Poxvirus Infection (2005)
- Doctoral advisor: Patrick O. Brown

Kathleen Hallisey Rubins (born October 14, 1978) is an American microbiologist, the inaugural director of the Trivedi Institute for Space and Global Biomedicine at the University of Pittsburgh, and retired NASA astronaut. She became the 60th woman to fly in space when she launched on a Russian Soyuz spacecraft to the International Space Station (ISS) on July 7, 2016. She returned to Earth in Kazakhstan on October 30, 2016, aboard a Soyuz. She was a crew member of Expedition 48/49 and Expedition 63/64 of the ISS. Rubins has spent a total of 300 days, 1 hour, and 31 minutes in space, which is the fourth most days in space by a U.S female astronaut.

== Biography ==
Rubins was born in Farmington, Connecticut, and raised in Napa, California. She did chores around the house to help her fund a trip to Space Camp in seventh grade. The camp inspired her to take more math and science classes in school. In July 2016, Rubin became the third female Space Camp alumna to fly in space. Her father, Jim, still resides in Napa and her mother, Ann Hallisey, lives in Davis, California.

Kathleen Rubins graduated from Vintage High School in Napa, California, in 1996. She received a Bachelor of Science degree in molecular biology from the University of California, San Diego, and a Ph.D. degree in cancer biology from Stanford University Medical School Biochemistry Department and Microbiology and Immunology Department. She was a member of the Kappa Lambda chapter of the Chi Omega sorority while attending UC San Diego.

For as long as she can remember, Rubins had always wanted to be an astronaut. Her initial understanding was that she would have to become a fighter pilot first and progress from there, but after getting involved with public health HIV prevention in high school she developed an interest in viruses and microbiology and decided to pursue that first instead. Some of her hobbies include flying airplanes and jumping out of them, scuba diving, and entering triathlons, in which she was a member of the Stanford triathlon team.

== Microbiology research ==
Rubins conducted her undergraduate research on HIV-1 integration in the Infectious Diseases Laboratory at the Salk Institute for Biological Studies. She analyzed the mechanism of HIV integration, including several studies of HIV-1 Integrase inhibitors and genome-wide analyses of HIV integration patterns into host genomic DNA. She obtained her Ph.D. from Stanford University and, with the U.S. Army Medical Research Institute of Infectious Diseases and the Centers for Disease Control and Prevention, Rubins (who was responsible for building its underlying microarray) and colleagues developed the first model of smallpox infection. She also developed a complete map of the poxvirus transcriptome and studied virus-host interactions using both in-vitro and animal model systems.

Rubins accepted a Fellow/Principal Investigator position at the Whitehead Institute for Biomedical Research (MIT/Cambridge, Massachusetts) and headed a lab of researchers studying viral diseases that primarily affect Central and West Africa. Work in the Rubins Lab focused on poxviruses and host-pathogen interaction as well as viral mechanisms for regulating host cell mRNA transcription, translation and decay. In addition, she conducted research on transcriptome and genome sequencing of Ebolavirus, Marburgvirus, and Lassa mammarenavirus, and collaborative projects with the U.S. Army to develop therapies for Ebola and Lassa.

Dr. Rubins also conducted research regarding space radiation and its effects on astronauts. The authors of this study investigated whether or not the Risk of Exposure-Induced Death (REID) that NASA had accepted was accurate enough. Much of the radiation in space is from ion exposure and solar cycle activity. The authors of the Nature paper concluded that although there are limitations in estimating the radiation levels that astronauts are exposed to while in space, more research needs to be done on the subject.

Another study that Dr. Rubins was involved with was the life-cycle analysis of a family of viruses including the smallpox virus. The researchers utilized fluorescent protein-based reporters to monitor and analyze the function of the Vaccinia virus. This study was important in starting to work on treatment for diseases like mpox. The mpox is a zoonotic disease originating from the rainforest around Central and West Africa. One can contract mpox when coming in contact with the virus from an animal, human, or any material that has been infected with the virus. In 2003, there was a small mpox outbreak in the United States, which provided more motivation for the study to be conducted. The results of this study provided useful information for the tracking of viral activity and replication. As of January 2023, there is still no cure for mpox, but it can be controlled.

Rubins was a part of the research team that investigated the effects of microgravity on RNA isolation and PCR analysis. The experiments occurred between April 19 and May 3, 2017. Operations required the use of the WetLab-2 hardware suite consisting of microgravity-compatible STT (ACT2 or Finger Loop syringe), SPM, bubble-removing Pipette Loader (PL), reaction tube centrifugation rotor and a Cepheid SmartCycler® for thermocycling/fluorescence readout. This study was conducted while on board the International Space Station (ISS). The experiment performed was one of the first successful ones in the WetLab-2, a research station built for microbiology in space. The results of this study were incredibly valuable for the future of space exploration and analysis of space environment samples.

Rubin is currently a professor of microbiology at the University of Pittsburgh. On January 30, 2026, she was announced as the inaugural director of Pitt's Trivedi Institute for Space and Global Biomedicine.

== NASA career ==
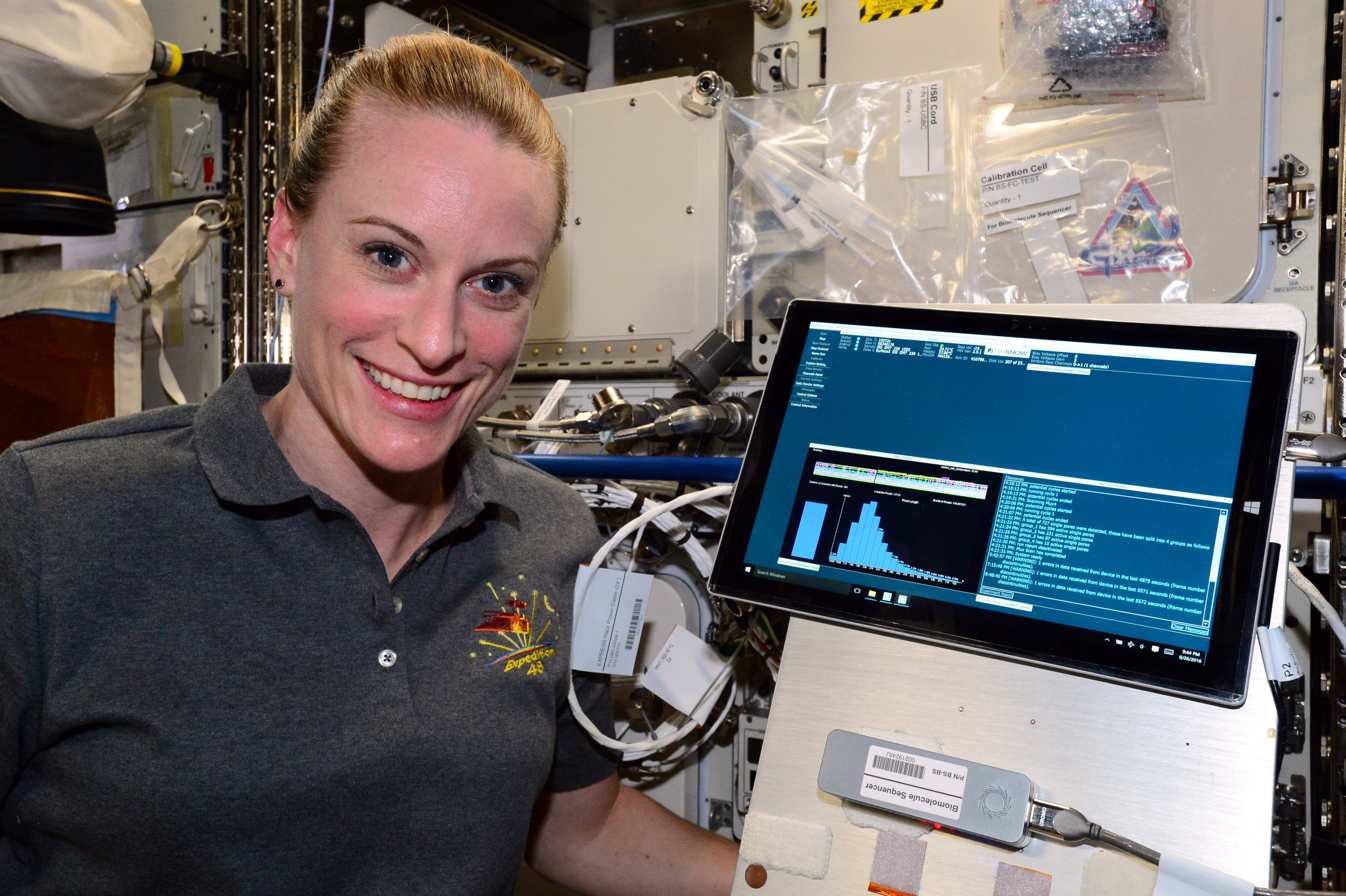
Rubins aboard the ISS with the USB MinION sequencer (lower right) that was used in the first DNA sequencing in space, August 2016

Rubins was selected in July 2009 as one of 14 members of NASA Astronaut Group 20. She graduated from Astronaut Candidate Training, where her training included International Space Station (ISS) systems, Extravehicular Activity (EVA), robotics, physiological training, T-38 flight training and water and wilderness survival training.

She became the 60th woman in space when she launched on Soyuz MS-01 in July 2016. She was inspired by learning the constellations with her dad and going to local "star-gazing" gatherings and science museums as early as she could remember as a young child. She had always been fascinated with science and exploring the world.

In 2021 and 2022, Rubins participated in the fourth edition of the ESA PANGAEA field geology training program. Together with the ESA astronaut Andreas Mogensen, Rubins trained in the Italian Dolomites, Ries Crater in Germany, the volcanic landscapes of Lanzarote, Spain, and the anorthosite outcrops of Lofoten, Norway.

=== Expedition 48/49 ===
Rubins left Earth for the first time on July 7, 2016, on board the new Soyuz MS spacecraft alongside Russian cosmonaut Anatoli Ivanishin and JAXA astronaut Takuya Onishi.

In August 2016, Rubins became the first person to sequence DNA in space. Rubins and the other astronauts were conducting research on how to diagnose an illness, or identify microbes growing in the International Space Station and determine whether or not they represent a health threat. San Diego graduate, Kate Rubins, used a commercially available machine to sequence mouse, virus and bacteria DNA. Aboard the ISS, she used a hand-held, USB-powered DNA sequencer called the MinION made by Oxford Nanopore Technologies to determine the DNA sequences of mouse, E. coli bacteria, and lambda phage virus. It was a part of the Biomolecule Sequencer experiment, the goal of which was "to provide evidence that DNA sequencing in space is possible, which holds the potential to enable the identification of microorganisms, monitor changes in microbes and humans in response to spaceflight, and possibly aid in the detection of DNA-based life elsewhere in the universe."

During her first stay in space, she also spent 12 hours and 46 minutes outside the station on two separate spacewalks. She made these two spacewalks with veteran spacewalker Jeffrey Williams. During her first spacewalk, Dr. Rubins successfully installed the first International Docking Adapter, which allows U.S. commercial spacecraft to dock. On her second spacewalk, Rubins installed new, high definition cameras. Rubins also captured the SpaceX Dragon commercial resupply spacecraft and sent back experiment samples to Earth.

Rubins returned to Earth on October 30, 2016, after 115 days in space.

=== Expedition 63/64 ===
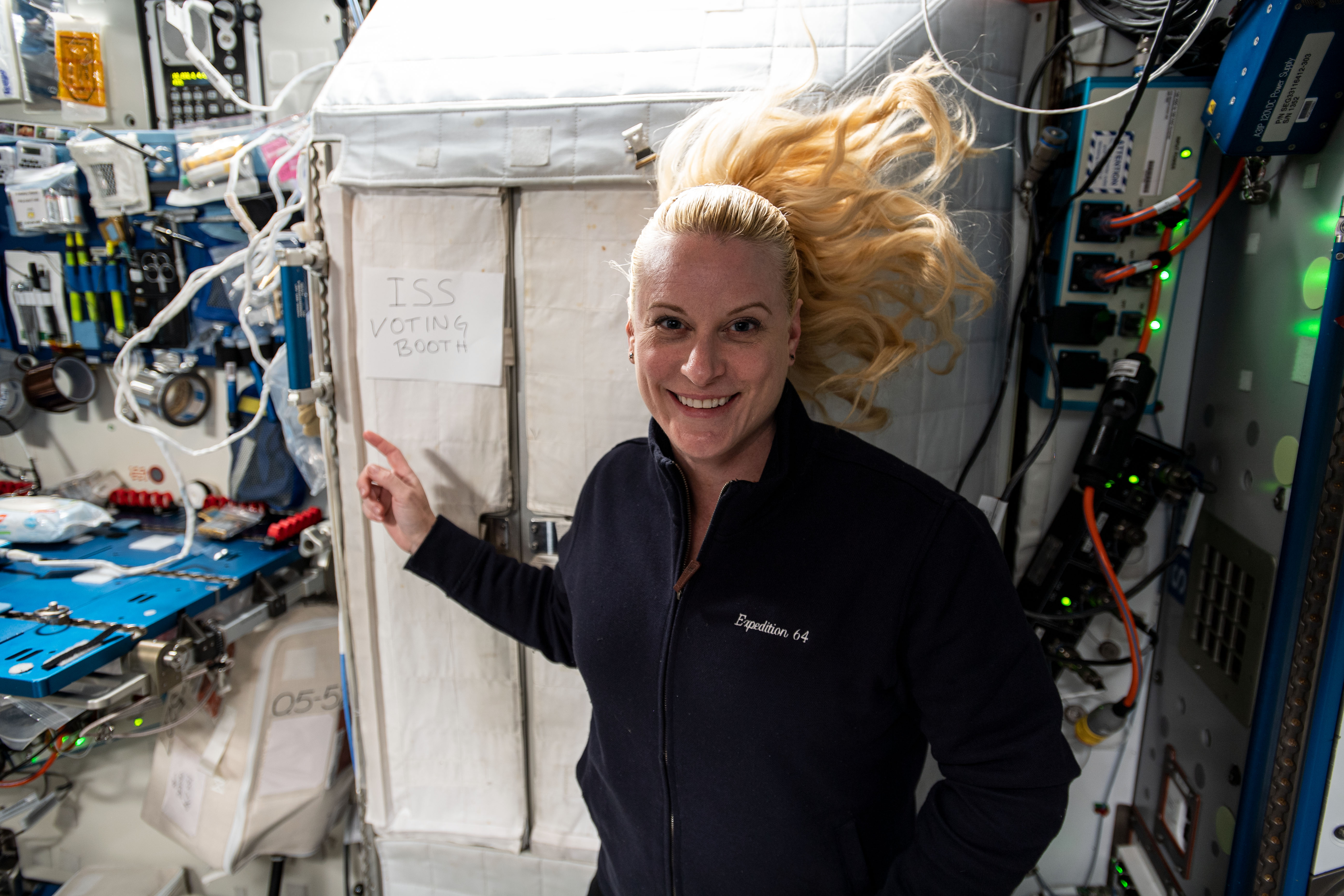
Rubins pictured next to the ISS "voting booth", where she cast her vote for the 2020 United States presidential election

Rubins launched on her second mission on October 14, 2020 (her 42nd birthday) with Russian cosmonauts Sergey Ryzhikov and Sergey Kud-Sverchkov aboard Soyuz MS-17. She returned to Earth on April 17, 2021, at 10:55 AM local (Kazakhstan) time, following the launch of Soyuz MS-18.

Rubins was on the ISS at the time of the 2020 United States elections and cast her absentee ballot from the station.

During her second stay in space, she made her third career spacewalk with Victor Glover, and her fourth with Soichi Noguchi in March 2021.

==== Research on Expedition 63/64 ====
While on the ISS during her most recent trip, Rubins continued research for the Cardinal Heart experiment which included cancer therapies and heart conditions. Microgravity significantly affects heart tissues that perform work and exert an opposite force to gravity and is known to cause molecular and structural abnormalities in cells and tissues that can lead to disease. The investigation could provide new understanding of similar heart issues on Earth and help identify new treatments. This study was analyzing the effects of low-gravity on heart muscles. Dr. Rubins and other scientists generated 3D engineered heart tissue. This research could provide important information for heart problems not only for astronauts returning home, but also for any citizen on Earth.

== Awards and honors ==
Rubins has a total of five honors and awards so far in her career. She received Popular Science's Brilliant Ten (2009), National Science Foundation Predoctoral Fellowship (2000), Stanford Graduate Fellowship - Gabilan Fellow (2000), UCSD Emerging Leader of the Year (1998), and Order of Omega Honor Society Scholarship Award (1998).

== See also ==
- Women in space
- List of female spacefarers
