= Egil Lillestøl =

Norwegian physics professor (1938–2021)

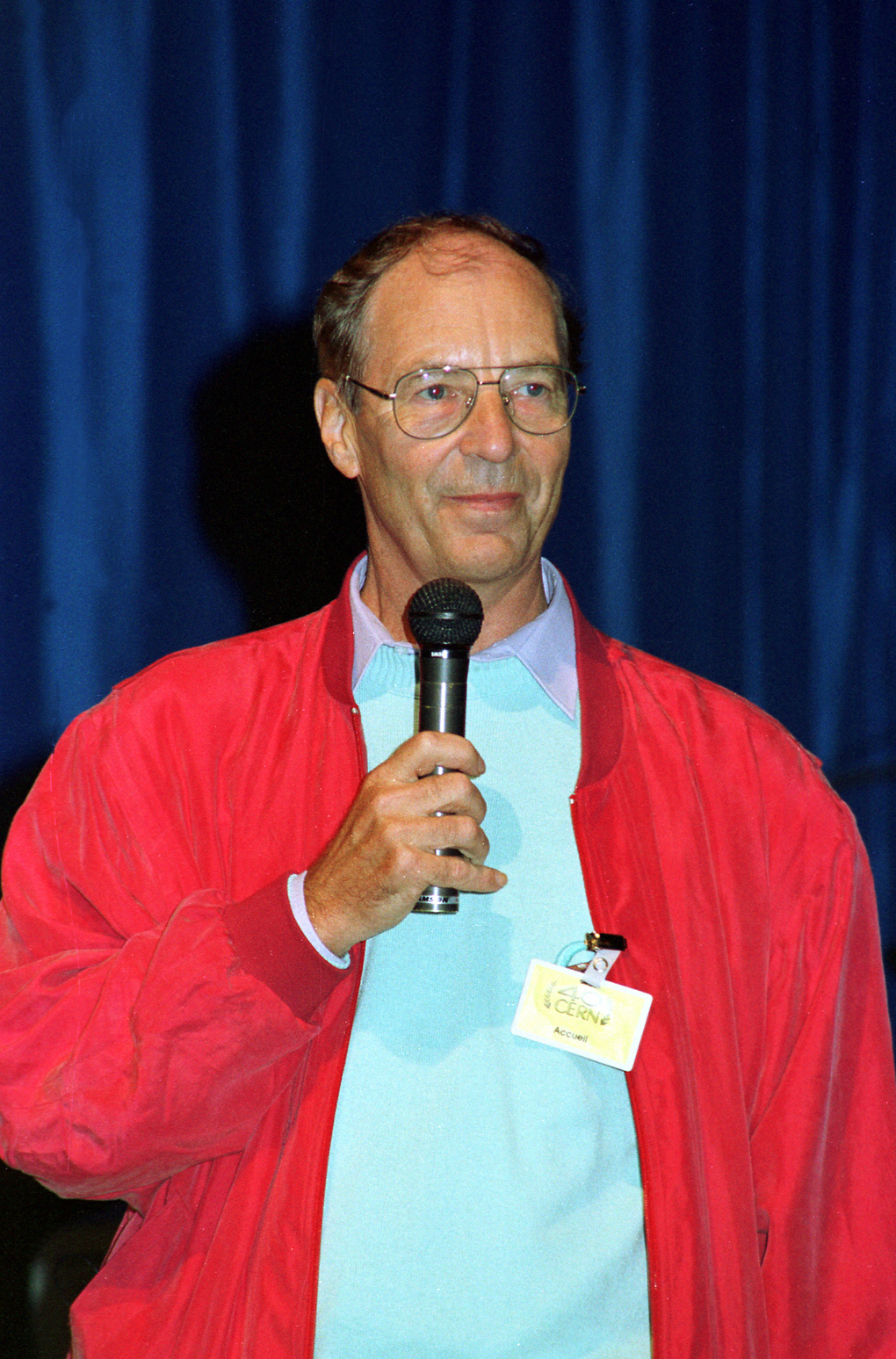
- Lillestøl in 1994
- Born: 19 March 1938; Bergen, Norway
- Died: 27 September 2021 (aged 83); Valence, France
- Education: University of Bergen
- Known for: Physics communication
- Awards: Research Council of Norway's Award for Excellence in Communication of Science (2007)
- Scientific career
- Fields: Particle physics
- Workplaces: University of Bergen; CERN
- Thesis: Study of annihilation of antiprotons at rest in hydrogen to multipion final states (1970)

Egil Sigurd Lillestøl (19 March 1938 — 27 September 2021) was a Norwegian experimental elementary particle physicist.

== Education and early career ==
Lillestøl graduated in 1964 from the University of Bergen and obtained his PhD from the same university in 1970. He was appointed associate professor at the university the same year and appointed professor in 1984. Leading up to his professorship in Bergen, he had been a fellow at CERN (1964–1967) in Geneva, Switzerland and a guest researcher at Collège de France (1973) in Paris.

== Career ==
Lillestøl was involved in experiments carried out at DESY, Hamburg, Germany, where he was central in the PLUTO Collaboration, and at CERN, where he was member of the DELPHI Collaboration. Furthermore, he was instrumental in the process to develop a long-term funding model allowing Norwegian research groups to participate in the LHC experiments ATLAS and ALICE.

Still affiliated with University of Bergen, Lillestøl took up positions at CERN. He was Deputy Head of CERN's Physics Division from 1990 to 1992. After this he split his time between the university and CERN. From 1992 to 2009 he was Head of the European School of Particle Physics, CERN Schools of Physics.

=== Physics communication ===
Lillestøl put a strong emphasis on physics communication. In addition to teaching at university level and giving presentations at international conferences, he also communicated complex physics concepts to both school children and the general public. He was a regular lecturer at the European Space Camp from 2001 onwards.

=== Energy and climate ===
Lillestøl was also interested in global energy issues and an opportunity to solve the world's energy problems using thorium-based nuclear power. He advocated establishing the use of nuclear power to solve the international energy crisis, and that Norway should build a prototype of a thorium reactor. He was founding member of the International Thorium Energy Committee.

Lillestøl was critical of the Norwegian climate debate and pointed out that the Earth's climate is very complicated, and climate science is young and still has a long way to go before one can hope to find complete explanations for the Earth's climate variations.

== Bibliography ==
Lillestøl co-authored the popular science book The Search for Infinity (1994), which has been translated into eight other languages. He also contributed to the preparation of the Norwegian textbook Generell fysikk for universiteter og høgskoler (General Physics for Universities and University Colleges) (2001). Furthermore, he was also one of the main drivers behind the UNESCO-supported traveling exhibition “Science bringing nations together”, organised jointly by JINR and CERN.

His scientific output, as recorded by the database Inspire-HEP, amount closely to hundred works.

== Awards ==
In 2007, he was awarded the Research Council of Norway's Award for Excellence in Communication of Science for "dissemination of basic physics to schoolchildren and the public".

Egil Lillestøl was a member of the Norwegian Academy of Technological Sciences and the Royal Norwegian Society of Sciences and Letters.
