= Welfare State Futures Programme =

European research program

NORFACE Welfare State Futures (WSF) Programme is an interdisciplinary transnational research programme focusing on future developments of European welfare states. It was launched in 2014 by the New Opportunities for Research Funding Agency Co-operation in Europe (NORFACE) network. Including 15 transnational projects with 250 researchers from 25 European countries, the programme analyzes the societal, economic, political and legal aspects of welfare state development and suggests pathways of its evolution in the future. As a key element of their research, the WSF projects enable and encourage cross-national cooperation, multi-disciplinary research and offer a wide European approach with opportunities for comparison. The programme is coordinated by Scientific Programme Coordinator Prof. Ellen Immergut at Humboldt-Universität zu Berlin (HUB)/European University Institute (EUI). It is funded by 15 NORFACE partners and the European Commission under the ERA-Net Plus funding, grant agreement number 618106. After the inception of the WSF Programme, NORFACE has gained 4 new partners, such that there are currently 19 members. More information about the NORFACE network and its partners can be found on the NORFACE website. The final conference including projects of all clusters, policymakers and industry experts was held at the European University Institute (EUI) on May 24–25, 2018. The Programme ends in June 2019.

== Research Clusters ==
=== Health ===
After the end of the cold war, many Eastern European post-Soviet states started to privatize their state-run health systems. At the same time, many Western, Southern and Northern European countries started experimenting with New Public Management and other market-oriented health reforms. The three projects in the Health Cluster (HEALTHDOX and HiNEWS and EXCELC) analyze the causes and consequences of these changing European health policies. The research investigates political determinants of health policy reforms, particularly those that privatize healthcare systems, and consequently focuses on the issue of social risks. It also analyses how reforms in healthcare affect individual attitudes towards the health system and addresses the question of why healthcare inequalities persist despite well-developed and universal health systems. Finally, it analyses how countries respond to changing welfare state preferences and how these preferences can best be measured, for example, in terms of health and long-term care services.

=== Migration ===
Migration patterns depend, among other things, on the state of welfare systems in the origin and destination countries. At the same time, due to migrants’ socialization in different welfare regimes and their often disadvantaged socio-economic positions, their perspectives provide a unique opportunity to test the central theories in the field of welfare regimes. Within the European Union (EU), two developments in particular challenge the welfare state: the transnationalization of citizenship and welfare rights and the judicialization of politics. In this context, there are issues of transferability, i.e. the transfer and recognition of the social rights of EU citizens who move from one member state to another. The projects in the Migration cluster (MIFARE, MobileWelfare, TransJudFare, TRANSWEL and UPWEB) integrate the migration dimension into welfare state research. They analyse how welfare systems affect mobility patterns and how transferability of welfare accounts plays into mobility across Europe. They also ask how welfare attitudes differ among migrant groups and how they compare to overall public opinion. Furthermore, they engage in research on how EU member states have responded to the transnationalization of welfare rights and the judicialization of politics. Finally, they ask how social rights of mobile citizens manifest in policy and in practice and in which ways mobile EU citizens experience, organize and manage their welfare transnationally.

=== Welfare State Attitudes ===
European welfare states are facing major challenges. Escalating costs, immigration, increasing inequality, international competition as well as populist politics are major challenges that need to be addressed. Personal responsibility is more and more stressed than state responsibility when it comes to the welfare state. However, this logic is questioned by traditional ideas about gender roles, care, and redistribution. New directions in welfare will be shaped by people's aspirations, ideas, and assumptions. The projects in the Welfare State Attitudes cluster (4Is, FPRWS, HEALTHDOX, MIFARE, WelfSOC) seek to explain support for redistribution and determinants of attitudes to welfare among different groups. Furthermore, this cluster investigates how program design shapes welfare attitudes and how an increased ethnic diversity affects the support of the welfare state by its citizens. Lastly, the research addresses questions on fairness and preferences regarding personal responsibility for welfare policies.

=== Child & Family Welfare ===
Family policies and social care services are at the intersection of increasingly diverse family situations and complex welfare state environments. There is variation between child protection systems between European countries as well as in how social services address family issues in different service areas. There are also differences in the role of the state in family life and in the ways different welfare states seek to balance children's rights to protection and parents' rights to family life. The projects in the Child & Family Welfare cluster (FACSK and HESTIA) seek to explain the impact of variations in child protection systems among different welfare states and how social work methods in family-based social work vary between welfare states. Furthermore, they investigate how social workers across different contexts understand notions of family and how they describe their practices and outcomes with families.

=== Globalization, Welfare States & Inequalities ===
International trade and technology, the integrated European labour market, transnationalization of citizenship and welfare rights, migration as well as persistent social inequalities are all challenges that national welfare states must face in Europe in the 21st century. European welfare states over time developed different methods to protect their households from adverse shocks but differences in the ability of current welfare states to reduce inequalities in the future can also be observed. The projects in the Globalization, Welfare States & Inequalities cluster (4Is, FPRWS, GIWeS, GlobLabWS and TransJudFare) try to identify determinants and patterns of inequality in European welfare states and how citizen's preferences for redistribution and welfare services are formed. Additionally, they analyze the role of welfare state policies in countering labor market and income inequalities, as well as how welfare states meet these challenges. They also ask how concerns for personal responsibility can be integrated in the design of welfare schemes. Lastly, the projects address the questions about fairness, the transnationalization of citizenships and the effects of technological innovations and their interaction with welfare institutions.

== NORFACE Welfare State Futures Projects ==
The WSF Programme consists of 15 transnational projects.

Inequalities, Insurance, Incentives and Immigration: Challenges and Solutions for the Welfare State (4Is)

4Is examines how recent challenges, such as increased economic uncertainty and ethnic diversity, have affected inequality and support for the welfare state in European countries. The project was led by Prof. Eva Mörk and consisted of 35 researchers in Finland, Sweden and the UK.

Exploring Comparative Effectiveness and Efficiency in Long-term Care (EXCELC)

EXCELC compares the effectiveness and efficiency of non-institutional long-term care (e.g. home care) for older adults and their informal careers in Austria, England, and Finland. Prof. Julien Forder led the project which consisted of 18 researchers in Austria, Finland and the UK.

Family Complexity and Social Work. A Comparative Study of Family-based Welfare Work in Different Welfare Regimes (FACSK)

FACSK analyzes how social workers in eight countries (Norway, Sweden, England, Ireland, Chile, Mexico, Lithuania and Bulgaria) understand different notions of family and how they describe their own practices and outcomes with families. The project consisted of seven researchers and was led by Prof. Lennart Nygren.

Fairness, Personal Responsibility and the Welfare State (FPRWS)

FPRWS analyzes how fairness considerations, in particular with respect to personal responsibility, affect the support and effectiveness of welfare policies. The ten researchers from Austria, the Netherlands and Norway were led by Prof. Alexander Cappelen.

Globalisation, Institutions and the Welfare State (GIWeS)

GIWes comparatively studies the effects of globalisation on how trade, technology, and the welfare state react towards challenges to national welfare states in an integrated European labour market and the political support for reform in Austria, Germany, Norway, and the UK. Prof Karl Ove Moene led the team of ten researchers from Austria, Norway and the UK.

Globalisation, Labour Markets, and the Welfare State (GlobLabWS)

GlobLabWS studies how the welfare state, globalization, and labour markets interact and determine a country's aggregate performance. The project was led by Prof. Catia Montagna and consisted of seven researchers from Germany, Sweden and the UK.

The Paradox of Health State Futures (HEALTHDOX)

HEALTHDOX explores future trajectories of European health politics and policies through an investigation of the impact of recent health reforms on health inequalities, health expenditures, and public attitudes towards both the health system and the welfare state in Estonia, Germany, Ireland, the Netherlands, Portugal and Sweden. Prof. Ellen Immergut led the team consisting of 21 researchers.

Policies and Responses with Regard to Child Abuse and Neglect in England, Germany and the Netherlands: A Comparative Multi-Site Study (HESTIA)

HESTIA aims to discover the nature and impact of variations in child protection systems through a comparison of three quite different welfare states (England, Germany, the Netherlands). The nine researchers were led by Prof. Hans Grietens.

Health Inequalities in the European Welfare States (HiNEWS)

HiNEWS analyzes why social inequalities in health care persist in European welfare states and what can be done to reduce them. The project was led by Prof. Clare Bambra and consisted of 15 researchers from Germany, the Netherlands, Norway and the UK.

Migrants’ Welfare State Attitudes (MIFARE)

MIFARE studies migrants’ welfare state attitudes in Denmark, Germany, and the Netherlands, and explains differences across migrant groups, as well as differences compared to the overall public opinion in the country of origin and the host country. Prof. Marcel Lubbers led the team of five researchers from Germany, the Netherlands and Norway.

European Welfare Systems in Times of Mobility (MobileWelfare)

MobileWelfare aims to understand the role of welfare systems in destination and origin countries for migration patterns within and towards Europe. The 12 researchers from the Netherlands, Poland, Portugal, and the UK were led by Prof. Helga de Valk.

Transnationalization and the Judicialization of Welfare (TransJudFare)

TransJudFare deals with two challenges for welfare states in the European Union, the transnationalization of citizenship and welfare rights and the judicialization of politics, and studies the impact of European case law on member states’ welfare states. The project was led by Prof. Susanne K. Schmidt. and consisted of 10 researchers from Austria, Denmark, Germany and the Netherlands.

Mobile Welfare in a Transnational Europe: An Analysis of Portability Regimes of Social Security Rights (TRANSWEL)

TRANSWEL addresses the social rights of EU citizens from the new EU member states who move to live and/or work in the old member states and traces the migration and transfer of social security rights between four pairs of countries: Hungary–Austria, Bulgaria–Germany, Poland–United Kingdom and Estonia–Sweden. The 12 researchers were led by Prof. Anna Amelina.

Understanding the Practice and Developing the Concept of Welfare Bricolage (UPWEB)

UPWEB responds to the question of how all residents living in super diverse neighborhoods in different national welfare states (UK, Portugal, Germany, and Sweden) put together their health care using wide-ranging resources to meet their health needs. 17 researchers from Germany, Portugal, Sweden and the UK engaged in the Project led by Prof. Jenny Phillimore.

Welfare State Futures: Our Children's Europe (WelfSOC)

WelfSOC examines the aspirations, assumptions, and priorities that govern the ideas of ordinary people about the future development of welfare in Europe. Prof. Peter Taylor-Gooby led the team consisting of 20 researchers from Belgium, Denmark, Germany, Norway, Slovenia and the UK.

== Funding ==
The Programme is funded by 15 NORFACE partners and the European Commission (ERA-Net Plus funding, grant agreement number 618106). The Swedish Research Council for Health, Working Life, and Welfare (Forte) has made an additional contribution to the programme. In total M€19 of funding is allocated to fifteen projects.
