= Research Council of Norway's Award for Excellence in Communication of Science =

The Research Council of Norway's Award for Excellence in Communication of Science (Norwegian: Norges forskningsråds formidlingspris) is awarded annually by the Research Council of Norway, a Norwegian government body. According to its bylaws, the prize is to be given in order to "reward and stimulate the dissemination of research to a broad audience. The dissemination must be of high quality in both form and content." The price is worth 500000 kr.

== Award winners ==
- 2020 Anne Sverdrup-Thygeson
- 2019 Audun Rikardsen University of Tromsø
- 2018 Bjørn H. Samset, Centre for International Climate and Environmental Research
- 2017 Henrik H. Svensen, University of Oslo
- 2016 Ingun Grimstad Klepp, Oslo Metropolitan University
- 2015 Anine Kierulf, University of Oslo
- 2014: Frank Aarebrot, Department of Comparative Politics, University of Bergen
- 2013: Jorunn Sundgot-Borgen, Sports Medicine Section, Norwegian School of Sport Sciences
- 2012: Nils Christian Stenseth, Department of Biology and the Centre for Ecological and Evolutionary Synthesis, University of Oslo
- 2011: Kalle Moene, Head of the Centre of Equality, Social Organization and Performance (ESOP), University of Oslo
- 2010: The website, Forskning.no
- 2009: Jørn H. Hurum, Natural History Museum at the University of Oslo
- 2008: Ole Didrik Lærum, Gades Institute, University of Bergen.
- 2007: Egil Lillestøl, Department of Physics and Technology, University of Bergen
- 2006: Wenche Blomberg, Institute of Criminology and Legal Sociology, University of Oslo
- 2005: Terje Tvedt, Head of Research at the Center for Development Studies, University of Bergen
- 2004: Odd Aksel Bergstad, MAR-ECO Project
- 2003: Bente Træen, Department of Psychology, University of Tromsø
- 2002: Thomas Hylland Eriksen, Department of Social Anthropology, University of Oslo
- 2001: Michael Baziljevich, Department of Physics, University of Oslo
- 2000: NRK P2s pop-science radio program Verdt å vite
- 1999: Henry Valen, Norwegian Institute of Social Research
- 1998: Dag O. Hessen, University of Oslo
- 1997: Asgeir Brekke, University of Tromsø, and Professor Alv Egeland, University of Oslo
- 1996: Lisbet Holtedahl, University of Tromsø
