= Karl Ove Moene =

Norwegian economist

Karl Ove (Kalle) Moene
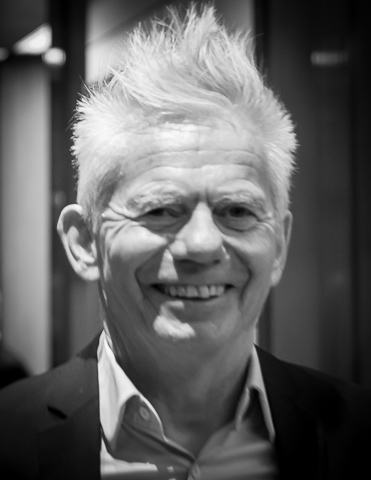
- Moene in 2016
- Born: 18 October 1949 (age 77); Voss Municipality, Norway
- Education: University of Oslo
- Occupation: economist
- Awards: Research Council of Norway's Award for Excellence in Communication of Science (2011)

Karl Ove Moene (born 18 October 1949) is a Norwegian economist. A professor at the University of Oslo, he has published extensively in scientific journals, as well as regularly contributing to public debate on economic issues.

== Career ==
Moene graduated as cand.oecon. from the University of Oslo in 1977, and as dr. philos. in 1984. He was appointed professor at the University of Oslo from 1987. His research interests include companies owned by and ruled by workers, the Nordic model and the welfare state, and development economics. He has published more than one hundred scientific papers. His books include Likhet under Press: utfordringer for den skandinaviske fordelingsmodellen from 2003 (co-writer), Marked uten kapitalisme: økonomisk demokrati med selveide bedrifter from 1990 (co-writer), and Alternatives to Capitalism from 1989 (co-editor). He takes part in public debate on economic issues, and is a regular columnist for the newspaper Dagens Næringsliv. In 2011, he was awarded the Research Council of Norway's Award for Excellence in Communication of Science. In 2017, he gave a TEDx talk on Universal basic share(UBS), which is variation on Universal basic income (UBI). He is a fellow of the Norwegian Academy of Science and Letters. In 2012, he was elected a member of the Academia Europaea. He is director of the GiWES: Globalisation, Institutions and the Welfare State Project which is part of the NORFACE Welfare State Futures Programme network.

Karl Ove Moene is a Georgist.

== Personal life ==
Moene was born in Voss Municipality on 29 October 1949, and grew up in Bergen.
