= Peter Taylor-Gooby =

British academic

Peter Frederick Taylor-Gooby OBE FBA FAcSS FRSA (born 5 March 1947) has been Professor of Social Policy at the University of Kent since 1990.

== Early life and education ==
Peter Frederick Taylor-Gooby was born on 5 March 1947 to John and Irene Taylor-Gooby. After studying at Watford Grammar School, he completed his undergraduate studies at the University of Bristol, graduating with a Bachelor of Arts degree in philosophy and English literature in 1969. Three years later, he completed a Diploma in Social Administration at the University of York, where he completed a Master of Philosophy degree in the same subject in 1974. York awarded him a doctorate in social policy in 1984.

== Career ==
=== Academic posts ===
In 1974, Taylor-Gooby took up a lectureship in social administration at the University of Manchester. Five years later, he joined the University of Kent as lecturer in social policy; promotions to senior lecturer and reader followed before he was appointed Professor of Social Policy there.

=== Research ===
According to the British Academy, Taylor-Gooby's research focuses on "risk and uncertainty; social policy and state welfare, especially theoretical and normative approaches; cross-national comparative work in Europe and East Asia; public attitudes to inequality, social justice and social policy". He has directed approximately 40 Economic and Social Research Council projects, published over 30 books and 300 articles, and chaired the British Academy's 'New Paradigms in Public Policy' programme in 2010–11. He was also a panel chairman on the Research Assessment Exercise 2008 and Research Excellence Framework 2014.

== Honours and awards ==
In 2001, Taylor-Gooby was elected a founding Academician of the Academy of Social Sciences (subsequently known as a Fellow); eight years later, he was elected a Fellow of the British Academy, the United Kingdom's national academy for the humanities and social sciences. He has also been a Fellow of the Royal Society of Arts since 2005, and was awarded the Lifetime Achievement Award by the Social Policy Association in 2013. Taylor-Gooby was appointed Officer of the Order of the British Empire (OBE) in the 2012 Birthday Honours for services to social science.

== Contribution to social policy ==
He played a major role in developing academic work as the first to apply quantitative attitude measurement to the politics of social policy in UK through a series of research projects financed by the Economic and Social Research Council and the Nuffield Foundation during the later 1970s and 1980s. He recognised the value of cross-national work in analysing change in public policy and pursued this by leading a series of collaborative European research projects financed by ESRC and the EU. This generated a new and influential analysis of welfare state change in terms of 'new social risks'. He then developed interdisciplinary approaches which combined political science, sociology, economic, psychology and social policy literatures on risk and risk analysis with policy work and applied this in a comparative context. This led to a series of books and articles on risk and policy, invitations to present papers in Barcelona, Chiba, Beijing, Berlin, Boston, Durban, New York, Oxford, Seoul, Sydney, Taipei, Toronto and Vancouver and the establishing of thematic groups on risk in the International Sociological Association and the European Sociological Association and to an international risk conference in Beijing.

He has also worked on new directions in social and public policy, analysing the impact of social change on social welfare and broadening the scope of social policy analysis to include new developments in public sector management, the relationship of the private and public sector and literatures on post-modern approaches to welfare and the political economy of public spending. More recent work draws these themes together in discussion of the impact of welfare state reform on political legitimacy and on social trust in the UK and elsewhere in Europe. His work has attracted particular attention in East Asia, leading to a number of official invitations to Korea and Japan, as a Distinguished Visitor to the Government of the Hong Kong Special Administrative Region and association with the Risk Research Centre at Beijing Normal University.

He is recognised as an influential contributor to current debates about welfare state reform in the recovery from the economic crisis in the UK and has been invited to speak at the British Academy and at more than 60 international conferences.

Peter received special recognition award from the Social Policy Association in 2013. He is director of the WelfSOC: Welfare State Futures: Our Children’s Europe project which is part of the NORFACE Welfare State Futures Programme.

Peter is seeking to present social science ideas to a wider audience through his novels 'The Baby Auction' (The Conrad Press, 2016) and 'Ardent Justice' (Troubador 2017).

== Selected works ==
=== Academic Studies ===
- Reframing Social Citizenship (2009)
- Risk in Social Science, (2006)
- Ideas and the Welfare State, (2005)
- New Risks, New Welfare, Oxford University Press, 2004
- Making a European Welfare State?, Blackwell, (2004)
- European Welfare Futures: Towards a Theory of Retrenchment (with Giuliano Bonoli and Vic George) Polity Press, 2000
- Risk, Trust and Welfare, Palgrave Macmillan, 2000
- Welfare States under Pressure (2001)
- Dependency Culture: The Explosion of a Myth (with Hartley Dean) (1992)
- Social Change, Social Welfare, Social Science (1991)
- The Private Provision of Public Welfare: State, Market and Community (with Elim Papadakis) Wheatsheaf, 1988
- Public Opinion, Ideology and State Welfare, Routledge and Kegan Paul, London, 1985
- Political Philosophy and Social Welfare: Essays on the Normative Basis of Welfare Provision (with Raymond Plant and Harry Lesser), 1980 and 2009.

=== Fiction ===
- "The Baby Auction" (2016)
- "Ardent Justice" (2017)
- "Blood Ties" (2020) Troubador Publishing website
- "A Kinder City" (2022) Troubador Publishing website
- "The Immigrant Queen" (2024)
