= Forskning.no =

Norwegian online newspaper

- Type: Daily newspaper
- Format: Online
- Owner: Foreningen for drift av forskning.no
- Editor: Nina Kristiansen
- Political alignment: Neutral
- Headquarters: Torshov, Oslo
- Country: Norway
- Circulation: 33,000 (as of January 2016)
- Sister newspapers: sciencenordicVidenskap
- Website: www.forskning.no

forskning.no (science and research) is an Oslo-based online newspaper established by the Research Council of Norway in 2002. It publishes news about science and research from Norway and abroad. The web site is run by Foreningen for drift av forskning.no, a non-profit organization which has 78 research institutions as members. forskning.no has its own writers and journalists and freelance writers. In addition articles are submitted by the research institutes and then edited by forskning.no staff before being published. Its English-language version is known as sciencenorway.no.

While the newspaper has owners, the editor and journalists choose what to write. forskning.no is an independent newspaper run after the rules of The Association of Norwegian Editors. They cooperate with the corresponding Danish online newspaper, videnskab.dk, among other things about the English-language news service, sciencenordic.com, which was established in 2011.

forskning.no has an average of 33,000 visits per day in January 2016 and 1 million visits per month. Nina Kristiansen is the editor in charge since 2007. She took over after Erik Tunstad.

== History ==
forskning.no was launched in 2002. The site's initial editor was Erik Tunstad at the time and first managing director was Steinar Q. Andersen.

The site was launched in 2002 after the initiative of the Research Council of Norway, and a total of 12 research institutions participated in the establishment. The idea was simple: to establish a dissemination information campaign, and then hand over the control to an independent editorial staff, working under The Association of Norwegian Editors and in accordance with Code of Ethics of the Norwegian Press.

An editorial of three, later five people, was established in a small yellow house at Mølla in Oslo. Ingrid Spilde and Arnfinn Christensen are the only ones left from the beginning, who are still working in forskning.no today. Today there are 77 research and education institutions that participate in the cooperation. These can also make submissions, which is considered and edited, and which is clearly marked with the institution as the sender. The editorial staff consists of 14 people: journalists, editor, editorial director and editors.

== Awards ==
- forskning.no won the Research Council of Norway's Award for Excellence in Communication of Science.
- Editor Nina Kristansen won the Editor Award in 2016. The award is handed out by Den Norske Fagpresses Forening (The Norwegian Professional Media Union).
- The forskning.no journalists Ingrid Spilde and Ida Kvittingen won the ViS-award for critical, insightful and sound research journalism for a series of articles they wrote for forskning.no about the science you don't get to read. The prize is handed out by Vitenskapsakademiet i Stavanger (The science academy in Stavanger)

== Owners ==
List of owners:

- Akershus University Hospital
- BI Norwegian Business School
- Centre for Advanced Study at the Norwegian Academy of Science and Letters
- Christian Michelsen Research
- Eastern Norway Research Institute
- Fafo Foundation
- GenØk – Centre for Biosafety
- Geological Survey of Norway
- Hedmark University College
- High North Research Centre for Climate and the Environment
- Institute for Church, Religion, and Worldview Research
- Institute for Rural and Regional Research (RURALIS)
- Institute Of Marine Research (NIFES)
- International Research Institute of Stavanger (IRIS)
- Molde University College
- Nasjonalforeningen for folkehelsen
- Nasjonal kompetansetjeneste for aldring og helse
- Nasjonal kompetansetjeneste for kvinnehelse
- National Development Center For Children And Young Adults (NUBU)
- Nofima
- Nord University
- NordForsk
- Nordland Research Institute
- Northern Research Institute (Norut)
- Norwegian Academy of Music
- Norwegian Biodiversity Information Centre
- Norwegian Centre for Organic Agriculture (NORSØK)
- Norwegian Centre for Violence and Traumatic Stress Studies (NKVTS)
- Norwegian Computing Center
- Norwegian Defence Research Establishment
- Norwegian Geotechnical Institute
- Norwegian Institute for Air Research (NILU)
- Norwegian institute for Bioeconomics (NIBIO)
- Norwegian Institute for Cultural Heritage Research (NIKU)
- Norwegian Institute for Nature Research (NINA)
- Norwegian Institute for Social Research
- Norwegian Institute For Water Research (NIVA)
- Norwegian Institute of International Affairs
- Norwegian Institute of Marine Research
- Norwegian Institute of public health (NIPH)
- Norwegian Mapping and Cadastre Authority
- Norwegian Polar Institute
- Norwegian Police University College
- Norwegian Radiation Protection Authority
- Norwegian School of Economics
- Norwegian School of Sport Sciences
- Norwegian Space Centre
- Norwegian University of Life Sciences (NMBU)
- Norwegian University of Science and Technology (NTNU)
- Norwegian Veterinary Institute
- Norwegian Water Resources and Energy Directorate (NVE)
- Opplysningskontoret for Meieriprodukter
- Oslo and Akershus University College
- Oslo University Hospital
- RBUP Øst og Sør
- Regional Research Funds In Norway (RFF)
- Research Council of Norway
- Simula Research Laboratory
- Statped
- Tannhelsetjenestens kompetansesenter Øst
- The Finance Market Fund
- The Foundation for Scientific and Industrial Research (SINTEF)
- The Norwegian Association of Local and Regional Authorities (KS)
- The Norwegian Centre for International Cooperation in Education (SIU)
- The Norwegian Directorate of eHealth (NDE)
- The Norwegian National Research Ethics Committees
- The Norwegian Seafood Research Fund (FHF)
- University Centre in Svalbard (UNIS)
- University College of Southeast Norway
- University of Agder
- University of Bergen
- University of Oslo
- University of Stavanger
- University of Tromsø
- Western Norway University of Applied Sciences
- Western Norway Research Institute
- Østfold University College

=== Former owners ===
- Oslo School of Architecture and Design
- MF Norwegian School of Theology
- The Centre of Competence on Rural Development
- Western Norway University of Applied Sciences
- Lillehammer University College
- Sogn og Fjordane University College
- Gender research
- Norwegian Cancer Society
- Norwegian Institute for Urban and Regional Research (NIBR)
- Trøndelag Research and Development AS
- The University Graduate Center (UNIK)
