= SpaceCamp (soundtrack) =

SpaceCamp: Original Motion Picture Soundtrack

Film score by John Williams
- Released: 1986
- Length: 47:06, 48:41, 49:05
- Labels: RCA Victor, Intrada

John Williams chronology
Indiana Jones and the Temple of Doom (1984)	SpaceCamp: Original Motion Picture Soundtrack (1986)	The Witches of Eastwick (1987)

The soundtrack to SpaceCamp is a release of the film's musical score composed and conducted by John Williams and performed by the Hollywood Studio Symphony, first released on 45 and LP in 1986, and reissued on CD in 1992 and again in 2010. Although originally released on LP in the United States in 1986 by RCA Victor, it was withdrawn from the market because of the film's unintentional similarities to the Challenger accident that had happened the same year. RCA Records' German LP release and Japanese 45 release were not likewise affected. A limited Japanese printing of 1000 CDs was re-released in 1992, and the Intrada Special Collection limited a CD printing to 3000 copies in 2010. Intrada Records released a 2-disk remastered and expanded soundtrack in May 2022, containing both the complete score from the film and the original soundtrack album.

== Track listings ==
=== Track listing (RCA, 1986) ===
1. Main Title – 3:08
2. Training Montage – 1:59
3. The Shuttle – 5:01
4. The Computer Room – 1:54
5. Friends Forever – 2:19
6. In Orbit – 3:15
7. White Sands – 6:49
8. SpaceCamp – 4:06
9. Viewing Daedalus – 2:43
10. Max Breaks Loose – 2:20
11. Andie is Stranded – 4:06
12. Max Finds Courage – 2:18
13. Re-Entry – 3:54
14. Home Again – 3:29

Total duration: 00:47:06

=== Track listing (Japanese CD re-release, 1992) ===
1. Main Title – 3:14
2. Training Montage – 2:04
3. The Shuttle – 5:08
4. The Computer Room – 1:59
5. Friends Forever – 2:25
6. In Orbit – 3:17
7. White Sands – 6:58
8. SpaceCamp – 4:12
9. Viewing Daedalus – 2:49
10. Max Breaks Loose – 2:26
11. Andie is Stranded – 4:13
12. Max Finds Courage – 2:24
13. Re-Entry – 4:00
14. Home Again – 3:32

Total duration: 00:48:41

=== Track listing (Intrada Special Collection 140, 2010) ===
1. Main Title – 3:07
2. Training Montage – 2:00
3. The Shuttle – 5:02
4. The Computer Room – 1:54
5. Friends Forever – 2:20
6. In Orbit – 3:12
7. White Sands – 6:52
8. SpaceCamp – 4:06
9. Viewing Daedalus – 2:45
10. Max Breaks Loose – 2:21
11. Andie is Stranded – 4:08
12. Max Finds Courage – 3:53
13. Re-Entry – 3:55
14. Home Again – 3:30

Total duration: 00:49:05

=== Track listing (Intrada Special Collection 474, 2022) ===
Disk One: The Film Score and Extras

1. Main Title – 3:10
2. The Jinx Connection – 0:31
3. Friends Forever – 2:23
4. Training Montage – 2:07
5. The Computer Room – 1:55
6. Jinx Commits – 1:19
7. The Shuttle – 5:10
8. In Orbit – 3:19
9. Insufficient Oxygen – 3:25
10. Arriving At Daedalus And Morse Code – 2:09
11. Viewing Daedalus – 2:50
12. I Can't Reach It – 1:51
13. Max Finds Courage – 2:24
14. Max Breaks Loose – 2:25
15. Rudy Comes Through – 1:38
16. Andie Is Stranded – 4:13
17. White Sands (Film Version) – 3:41
18. Re-Entry – 4:00
19. Home Again – 3:34
20. SpaceCamp – 4:12
21. Main Title (Film Version) – 3:14
22. White Sands (Album Edit) – 6:57
23. Home Again (Short Version) – 2:44

Total duration: 00:69:53

Disk Two: The Original Soundtrack Album

1. Main Title – 3:08
2. Training Montage – 2:02
3. The Shuttle – 5:05
4. The Computer Room – 1:56
5. Friends Forever – 2:22
6. In Orbit – 3:15
7. White Sands – 6:55
8. SpaceCamp – 4:09
9. Viewing Daedalus – 2:48
10. Max Breaks Loose – 2:23
11. Andie is Stranded – 4:11
12. Max Finds Courage – 3:52
13. Re-Entry – 3:57
14. Home Again – 3:33

Total duration: 00:48:36

== Additional music ==
The soundtrack that was released only contained Williams' instrumental score. Other tracks that appear in the film, but not in the soundtrack, are:

- "Walk of Life" – Dire Straits
- "So Far Away" – Dire Straits
- "Forever Man" – Eric Clapton
- "American Girl" – Joseph Williams and Paul Gordon
- "Don't Look Back" – Joseph Williams
- "Turn It Up" – Joseph Williams
