= Space Camp =

Educational camp in Huntsville, Alabama

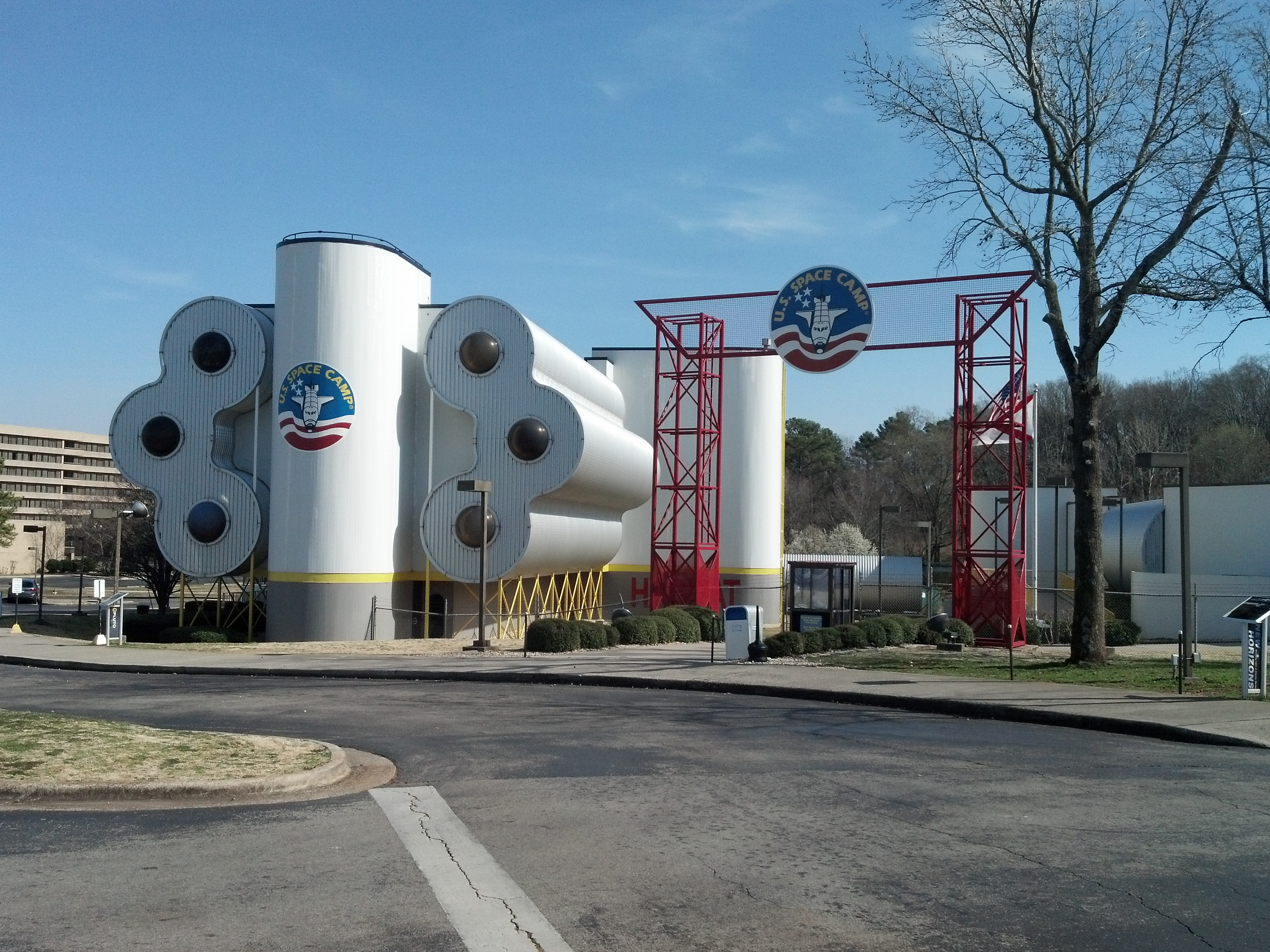
- Habitat One (left) and Habitat Two (right) at Space Camp.

- Location within the United States
- Location: Huntsville, Alabama, U.S.
- Coordinates: 34°42′41″N 86°39′15″W
- Operated by: U.S. Space & Rocket Center
- Established: 1982
- Website: https://www.spacecamp.com/

Space Camp is an educational camp in Huntsville, Alabama, on the grounds of the U.S. Space & Rocket Center (USSRC) museum near NASA's Marshall Space Flight Center. It provides educational programs for children and adults on topics such as space exploration, aviation, and robotics. It is run by the Alabama Space Science Exhibit Commission.

== History ==
Space Camp was founded in 1982 by USSRC Executive Director Edward O. Buckbee as an educational camp to promote mathematics and science to children using the U.S. space program as a basis. The idea for the camp was proposed by Wernher von Braun in 1977 while touring the USSRC, where he noticed a group of students taking notes on what they were learning.

=== U.S. Space & Rocket Center Education Foundation ===
The U.S. Space & Rocket Center and the camp in Huntsville are operated by the Alabama Space Science Exhibit Commission, a state agency whose members are appointed by the Governor of Alabama. The U.S. Space & Rocket Center Foundation is a separate non-profit entity and its board members are not appointed by the governor. It is responsible for scholarship, fundraising, and the licensing of camps outside the United States.

== Programs ==
The center offers several programs. Space Camp was the first of the camp programs offered, and is used also as the umbrella organization name.

- Space Camp is a "six-day" (really four-and-a-half days—Sunday afternoon through Friday 9 am) program offered for children between 9 and 11 years old. Children study space, aviation, and robotics.
- Space Academy is intended for ages 12–14 and is also offered in six-day sessions.
- Advanced Space Academy is designed for 15 to 18-year-olds. The program was originally known as Space Academy Level II and was started in the Fall of 1987. In 1987, the Space Academy Level II program was college accredited (1 hour) through the University of Alabama Huntsville.
- The Family Camp program allows parents or guardians to attend Space Camp with their child. The program is run throughout the year, and lasts three to four days. Family Camp also has an Aviation Challenge option during summer months.
- Advanced Space Academy Elite is offered to graduates of the Advanced Space Academy program.

Additionally, Space Camp has previously offered a twelve-day Advanced Space Academy program that included features such as multiple missions, scuba diving, use of some of the Aviation Challenge facilities, and a twenty-four-hour extended duration mission.

=== Other programs ===
Other programs include corporate programs, programs for adults and educators, educational field-trips for school groups, and the X-Camp outdoor leadership camp. There were also special alumni sessions during the summer of the 25th anniversary.

Occasionally themed camps have been offered, usually in conjunction with museum exhibits. During the summer of 2010, a Jedi Experience camp was offered in connection with the traveling museum exhibit Star Wars: Where Science Meets Imagination.

Aviation Challenge logo

=== Aviation Challenge ===
The Aviation Challenge (AC) is a set of aviation-oriented programs at the camp, consisting of three programs for children from ages 9–18. The camps utilize computer-based flight simulators, which train attendees to fly, act, and think like fighter pilots.

== Facilities ==
=== Simulators ===
There are several simulators at Space Camp, such as:

- The Multi-Axis Trainer (MAT) simulates disorientation, similar to the Multiple Axis Space Test Inertia Facility (MASTIF) developed for Project Mercury
- The 1/6 Chair simulates walking on the Moon
- The 5DF Chair simulates the frictionless environment of outer space in five degrees of freedom
- The Manned Maneuvering Unit (MMU) simulates working untethered in a frictionless environment, such as during extravehicular activity (also known as an EVA or spacewalk).

Space Camp additionally uses rides or attractions that are on site at the USSRC as instructional tools. The Space Shot simulates liftoff, and the G-Force Accelerator simulates the G-forces put on astronauts while re-entering the Earth's atmosphere or during launch.

The Intuitive Planetarium provides a venue for presenting space and science-oriented shows produced through a Digistar 7 system and 5 Christie laser projectors. The planetarium is part of the center's museum complex. In February 2019, the Intuitive Planetarium replaced the Spacedome IMAX theater, which had operated at the Center since 1982.

=== Accommodation ===
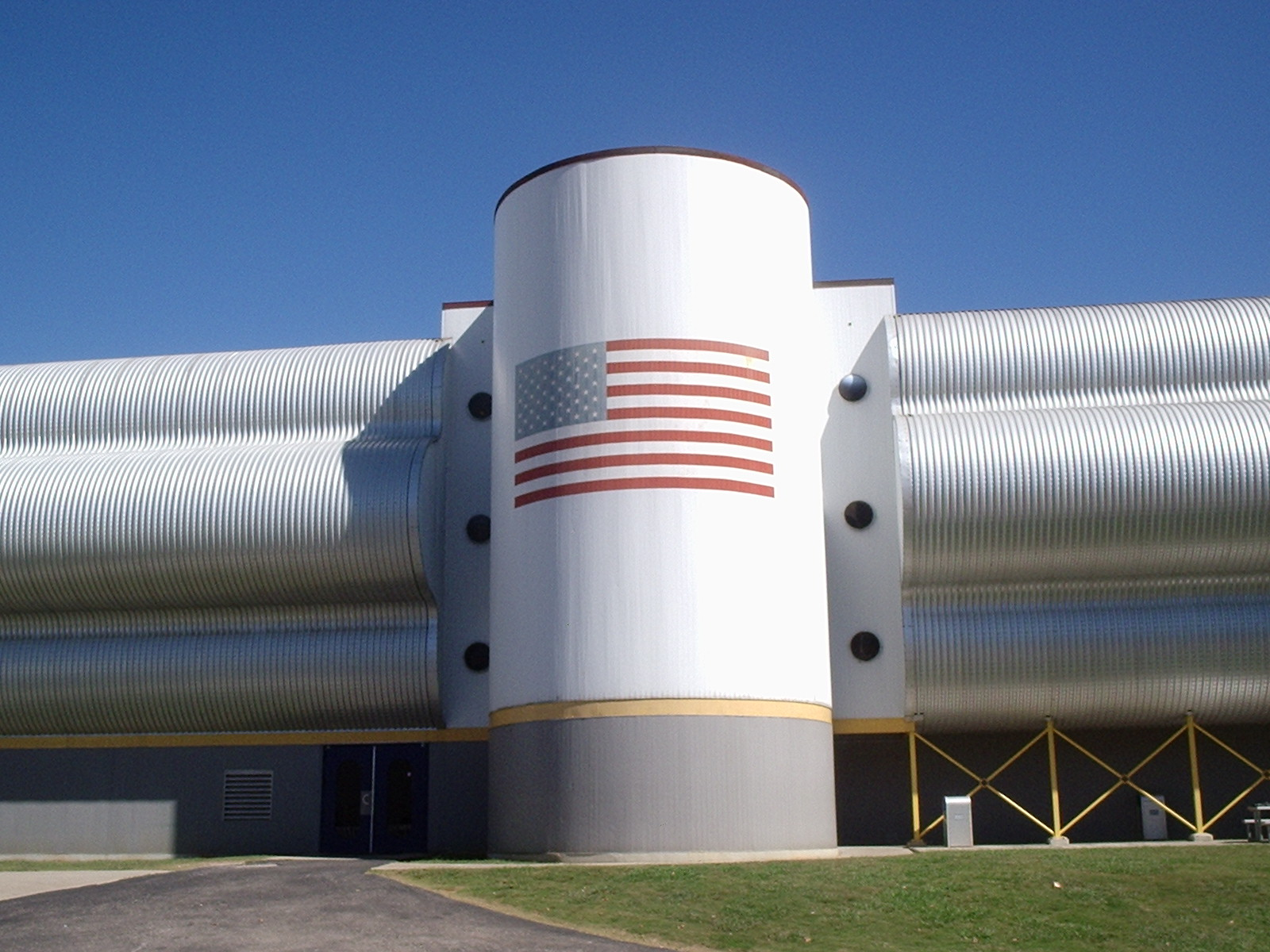
Space Camp Habitat 1 facility

If a Space Camp program extends beyond a single day, participants are accommodated at either Habitat 1 or Habitat 2. These habitats are facilities that house both the trainers and trainees. These are mainly used by the Space Academy campers.

Aviation Challenge trainees stay in Habitat 3 where they are required to maintain military standards to their bays and racks.

Both habitats are segregated between male and female campers, usually being the males on the first floor and the females being on the second.

=== Inspiration4 Skills Training Complex ===
Initially funded in 2022, the complex officially opened in 2026. Supported by two multimillion-dollar donations from NASA administrator Jared Issacman and public donations, the complex is 40,079 square feet and named after the Inpiration4 orbital mission. The facility includes: climbing wall, challenge course, drone range, mission control, 1/6 gravity chair, multi access trainer and mission simulators for aviation, space, parachuting.

== Other camps ==
There are a number of internationally licensed Space Camps, including Space Camp Turkey, Space Camp Canada (French: Camp Spatial), and Space Camp Belgium. There have been other space camps in the United States in the past, but they have been closed.

=== Space Camp Florida ===
Space Camp Florida was established in 1988 and shared facilities with the Astronaut Hall of Fame in Titusville, Florida, both of which were operated by the now-defunct U.S. Space Camp Foundation. The Space Camp facility in Florida closed in 2002 due to low attendance, which led to financial difficulties. About 50,000 students attended the camp during its run, but in its final year, as few as 14 participants filled 276 slots. The Astronaut Hall of Fame was sold to the Delaware North corporation and remained open until 2015 as an added attraction to the Kennedy Space Center Visitor Complex, with several simulators previously used by the camp available to all visitors. As of 2020, the building was being used by Lockheed Martin to support work on the NASA Orion crew capsule.

=== Space Camp California ===
Space Camp California was operated by the now-defunct U.S. Space Camp Foundation at Mountain View, California from 1996 to 2002, when it closed due to financial difficulties.

=== Space Camp Hall of Fame ===
The Space Camp Hall of Fame was inaugurated in 2007 during the 25th-anniversary celebrations. The Hall was established to honor alumni and former employees by recognizing their contributions and personal time spent at the Space Camp.

Inductees of Space Camp
Inductee	Year
Wernher von Braun	2007
Edward O. Buckbee	2007
Georg von Tiesenhausen	2007
Dan Oates	2007
Dorothy Metcalf-Lindenburger	2007
James Rice	2007
Amanda Stubblefield	2007
Penny J. Pettigrew	2007
Oscar Holderer	2008
Marlenn Maicki	2008
Lisa Devries	2008
Vincent Vazzo	2008
Phillip A. Smith	2008
Josh Whitfield	2008
Jim Allan	2009
Jerry Gleason	2009
Robert Pearlman	2009
Francis French	2010
J. David Hnyda	2010
Danny R. Jaques	2010
Andrea M. Hanson	2010
Michelle Thaller	2011
Valerie Meyers	2011
William Burke Hare III	2011
Stephanie Abrams	2012
Lara Elizabeth Warren	2012
Ed Van Cise	2012
Robert L. Gibson	2012
Kaya Tuncer	2014
Samantha Cristoforetti	2014
Michelle Lucas	2014
Susanna Phillips	2015
Elizabeth Keller Bierman	2015
Kathleen Rubins	2015
Bobak Ferdowsi	2015
Jason Hopkins	2016
Amy Kaminski	2016
George T. Whitesides	2016
SpaceCamp (1986 film)	2016
Serena Auñón	2017
Michelle Christensen	2017
John Hecker	2017
Jennifer Heldmann	2017
Tara Ruttley	2018
Erika Wagner	2018
Sarah Noble	2018
Tara Sweeney	2018
Mary Funk	2019
Casey Harris	2019
Christina Koch	2019
Beth Moses	2019

== See also ==
- Space Camp Turkey
- Space Camp Spain
- European Space Camp
