= Bente Træen =

Norwegian dentist and sexologist (1958–2023)

- Born: 15 October 1958; Oslo, Norway
- Died: 17 April 2023 (aged 64); Norway
- Education: University of Oslo
- Occupations: Dentist, sexologist
- Employer(s): University of Tromsø; University of Oslo
- Awards: Research Council of Norway's Award for Excellence in Communication of Science (2003)

Bente Træen (15 October 1958 – 17 April 2023) was a Norwegian dentist and sexologist.

== Life and career ==
Træen was born in Oslo on 15 October 1958. She graduated as cand.odont. from the University of Oslo in 1985, and obtained a Ph.D. in 1993. She was appointed professor of health psychology at the University of Tromsø in 2001. She administered several investigations on sexual habits in the Norwegian population. In 2003, she was awarded the Research Council of Norway's Award for Excellence in Communication of Science. From 2012 she was assigned with the University of Oslo, a professor of health psychology at the Institute of Psychology at the time of her death.

Træen was a regular columnist for Forskersonen (forskning.no), and she wrote the weekly column Sexliv for Dagbladet's supplement Magasinet.

Træen suffered a cerebral haemorrhage on 15 April 2023. She died in hospital two days later on 17 April, at the age of 64.

== Selected works ==
- Elske deg, elske med deg – en lærebok i sex og samliv. 1999. (co-writer)
- Ditt liv og mitt liv – SAMMEN. 2004. (co-writer)
