= European Space Camp =

Summer camp

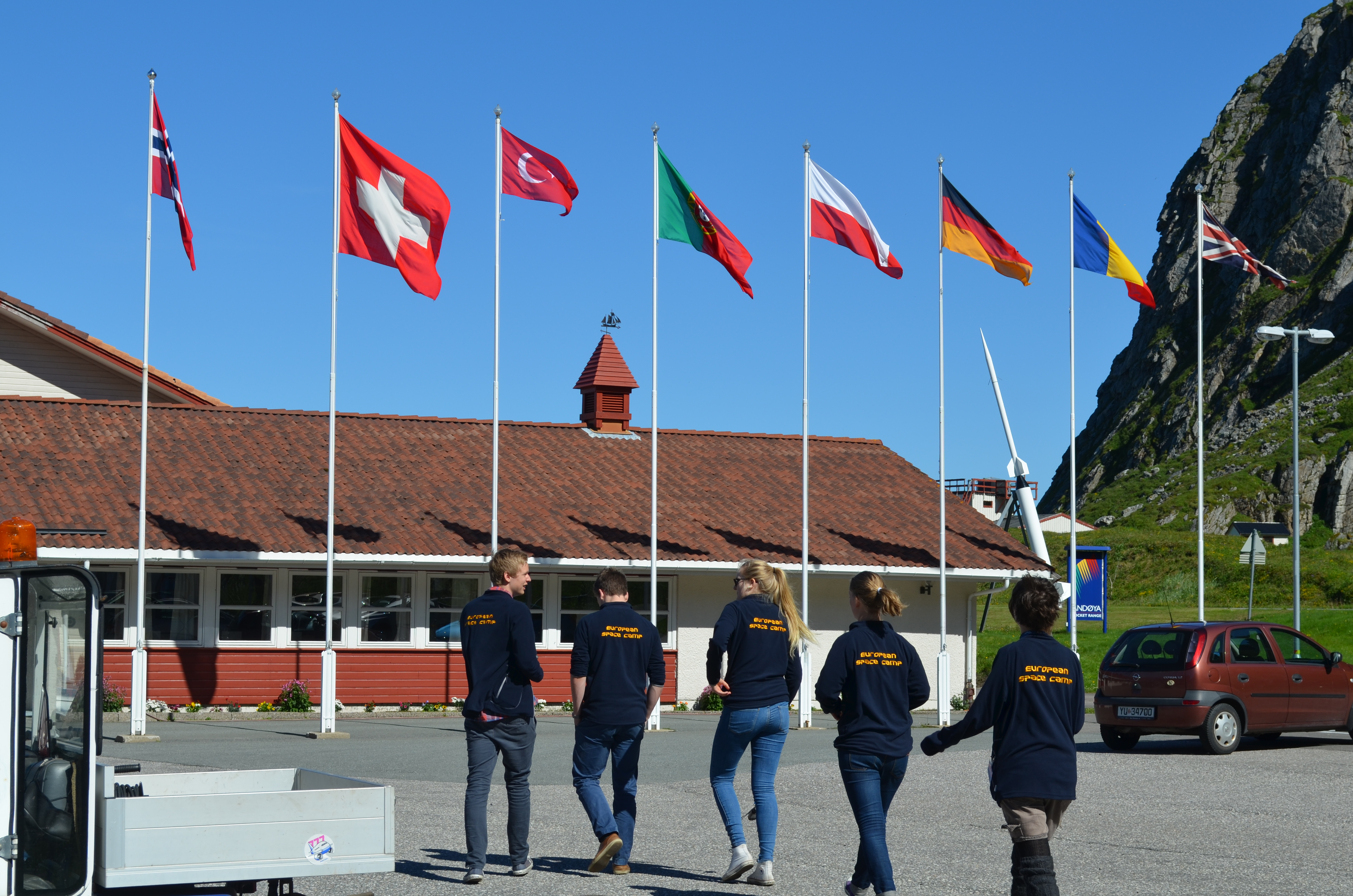
- European Space Campers in front of the Andøya Space Center with the flags of some participant's countries displayed.

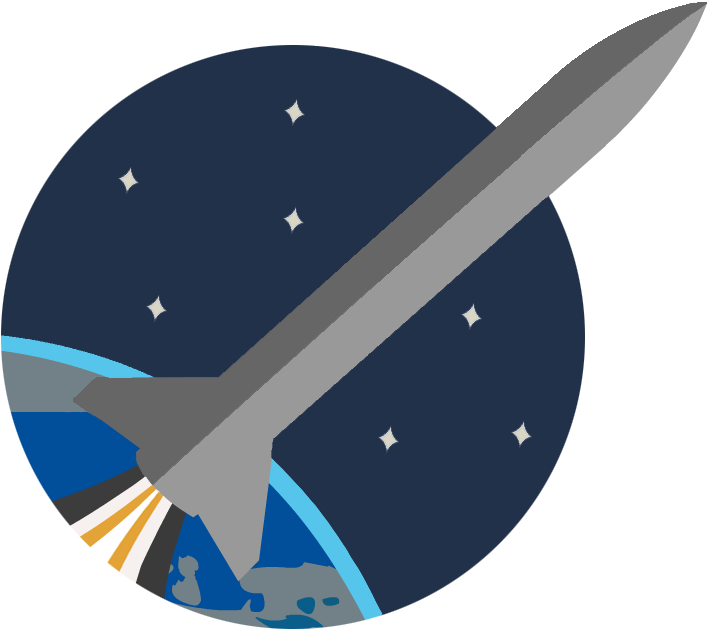

- Location within Norway
- Location: Andøya Space Center, Andøya, Norway
- Coordinates: 69°17′39.84″N 16°01′11.28″E
- Operated by: European Space Camp and Andøya Space Education
- Established: 1996
- Slogan: The sky is not the limit, it's where the fun begins!
- Website: http://www.spacecamp.no/

European Space Camp (ESC) is a summer camp for youths aged 17–20, which focuses on giving a hands-on experience into the field of aerospace engineering and space sciences. Participants from all over Europe and the world stay at the Andøya Space Center in Northern Norway for one week, learning from professionals and becoming amateur rocket scientists. Ultimately the goal of the camp is to launch a student sounding rocket, capable of carrying several sensors and reaching a height of 10 000m and Mach 3. Participants are divided into groups ordered with respect to their interests and work together as a team for the week-long project of launching a student rocket. The students are involved in every aspect of the rocket campaign, ranging from internal circuitry and scientific case work to creating the payload of weather balloons for monitoring wind conditions prior to launch. Through the European Space Camp experience the young people are motivated to redirect their studies or renew their interest in the direction of science and technology.

The scientific part of the camp is divided between lectures and group work. Some of the best lecturers from across Europe lecture on topics as diverse as Rocket Physics, the work of CERN and the Northern Lights. Group work enables participants to spend a week in the life of a scientist and tackle problems as part of a self-proposed scientific study relating to the rocket launch at the end of the week. The participants are divided into the following groups during the rocket campaign: Payload, Sensor Experiments (this group is also in charge of the balloon payload), Science Experiments, and Telemetry. The highlight of the week is the rocket launch, after which there is just enough time to analyse the collected data.

An important part of ESC is connecting with the other participants. Therefore, a number of social activities are organised throughout the week, such as a mountain hike and swimming in the Arctic Ocean.

== History ==
European Space Camp at Andøya Rocket Range was arranged for the first time in the summer of 1996. It was the Norwegian Association of Young Scientists that initiated the idea of a summer camp with this specific subject. Today, the camp is made possible by the joint efforts of Andøya Space Center and Andøya Space Education, in cooperation with the Norwegian Space Centre and the European Space Agency (ESA).

The first Space Camp Andøya in 1996 was such a success that the concept was developed further each year. In 2001 Space Camp became a European event which in 2002 hosted participants from 10 different countries. European Space Camp is special with regard to subjects dealt with, the participants' real involvement in the work and what they learn during the camp. The youths at ESC work in groups on specific tasks which are all related to the rocket launch at the end of the camp. The students are treated as real scientists and work on advanced problems using professional equipment. The professors and scientists being around are valuable resources and helpers, leaving all the actual scientific work to the participants.

== Organizers and Partners ==
=== Team Space Camp ===
The organising team consists of former participants of the camp, who volunteer to work on the independent, non-profit organisation of ESC.

- Surabhi Sathish (Head)
- Figaro Stenlund
- Tiril Kamfjord
- Jette Albrecht
- Cornelius Skivenes-Cappelen
- Eva Van Dessel

=== Andøya Space Education represented by ===
- Anne Margrethe Horsrud
- Hege-Merethe Strømdal
- Anita Hanssen

=== Notable guests ===
- Alv Egeland has been a lecturer since the first camp in 1996.
- Egil Lillestøl has been a lecturer since 2001.
- Christer Fuglesang was a guest lecturer in 2016 for the 20th anniversary.
- Andrei Borisenko was a guest lecturer 2017.
- Charles Simonyi visited the camp in 2015.
- Jannicke Mikkelsen was a guest lecturer 2025.

== See also ==
- Space Camp Turkey
- Space Camp Spain
- Space Camp (United States)
