= Lisbet Holtedahl =

Norwegian film director and professor

- Born: 26 June 1946 (age 80); Copenhagen, Denmark
- Education: University of Tromsø
- Occupation: social anthropologist
- Awards: Research Council of Norway's Award for Excellence in Communication of Science (1996)

Lisbet Holtedahl (née Therkelsen; born 26 June 1946) is a Danish-born Norwegian social anthropologist and film producer.

== Biography ==
Holtedahl was born in Copenhagen to dentist Stig Oscar Therkelsen and Lizzie Jacobsen. In 1967 she married professor of medicine, Knut Arne Holtedahl. She graduated as cand.mag. from the University of Tromsø in 1973, and as dr. philos. in 1987. She also received film education at the Ateliers Varan in Paris. She was appointed professor at the University of Tromsø from 1992, and has also collaborated with the French institutions, Laboratoire d'anthropologie des institutions et des organisations sociales and Fondation Maison des sciences de l'homme. Her research objects have been villages in Northern Norway and societies in Cameroon, often with focus on women's role in the society. She has produced several anthropological films, as an aid both for research and documentation. In 1996, she was awarded the Research Council of Norway's Award for Excellence in Communication of Science.
