= Lisbet Hindsgaul =

Danish politician, activist, and author

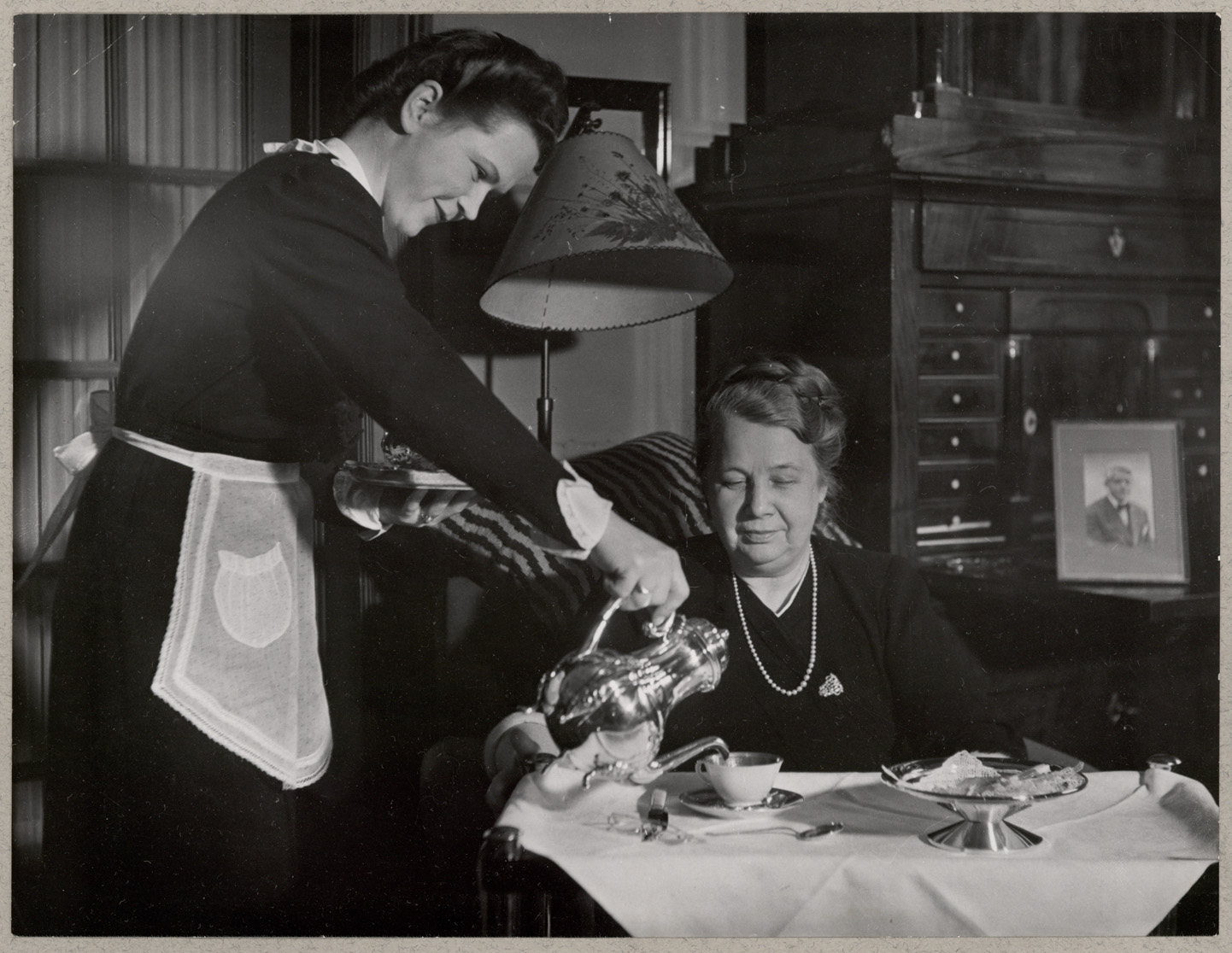
Lisbet Hindsgaul

Lisbet Hindsgaul née Jonsen (1890–1969) was a Danish politician, women's rights activist and parliamentary auditor. A member of the Conservative People's Party, she was particularly successful in building up the party's women's committee, DKFK, between 1943 and 1961. From 1935, she was a member of the Landsting until it was abolished in 1953 but was not elected to the Folketing. She was particularly active in Greenland, chairing the Association for Assistance to Greenlandic Children (Foreningen til Hjælp for Grønlandske Børn).

== Biography ==
Born in the Copenhagen suburb of Hundige on 21 May 1890, Lisbet Jonsen was the daughter of the schoolteacher Laurids Jonsen (1850–1920) and Hansine Kathrine Ditlevsen Ravn (1860–1957). Raised in Hundige, she was influenced by her father's interest in politics. In 1915, she married the factory owner Ferdinand Christian Hindsgaul, with whom she had a son Niels-Jesper John in 1926. The marriage was dissolved in 1939.

An active member of the Danish Women's Society, she became a board member of the Copenhagen branch in the 1920s, taking a special interest in the history and politics of the movement. Encouraged by Hedevig Matthiesen of the Women's Society, she ran in the municipal and parliamentary elections in 1929. Succeeding at the municipal level, she was active in child care and support for the socially disadvantaged. She ran unsuccessfully in the 1932 general election but was elected to the Landsting in 1925 where she represented the Conservative People's Party until the Landsting was dissolved in 1953. In addition to social issues, she was active in defence policy and, from 1937, in legislation on pregnancy, which led to provisions for abortion on medical and ethical grounds and, in 1950, if a woman suffered from physical or mental defects.

Hindsgaul was passionately interested in Greenland, making visits almost every year from 1948 to 1964. She chaired the Association for Assistance to Greenlandic Children which established several sanatoriums for children with infectious diseases. She was particularly active in the fight against tuberculosis. As a member of the Greenlandic Parliamentary Committee, on one occasion, after all her fellow members had cancelled a trip to Thule as they thought it was too far away, she continued alone. There she addressed a meeting of some 300 native Greenlanders, all men. They were astounded as it was quite unusual for women to speak at such meetings. The explorer Peter Freuchen is remembered for calling her "Rigsdagen's only real man".

Hindsgaul was active in many bodies associated with women, especially the Women's Committee of the Conservative People's Party (DKFK), the first conservative women's association in Southern Jutland. She was also a member of King Frederik IX and Queen Ingrid's Foundation for Fighting Tuberculosis in Greenland, of Red Barnet (Save the Children), and of the Danish Association for Diabetes. From 1950 to 1961, she was a parliamentary auditor and from 1954 to 1962, a member of Copenhagen's Citizen's Representation.

Lisbet Hindsgaul died on 21 March 1969 in Copenhagen.

== Awards ==
In 1950, she was awarded the Royal Medal of Recompense (gold). After being honoured as a Knight of the Order of the Dannebrog in 1954, she was raised to a Knight First Class in 1962.
