= Nordland Research Institute =

Norwegian regional research institute

Coordinates: 67.289718°N 14.560313°E

Nordland Research Institute is a regional research institute based out of Bodø, Norway, and is also connected to the Nord University. It is the only social science research institute in Northern Norway with both ownership and headquarters in the north. They carry out research projects concerning social sciences and business management disciplines and focus most on welfare, education, entrepreneurship, innovation, enterprise and business development, natural resource management, environment and climate change, and regional development. Research results are disseminated through reports, articles and lectures.

Nordland Research Institute aims to conduct research, communication, development and innovation in active cooperation with private and public companies and other research institutes. They also participate actively in development processes both within the private industry and the public sector. At the end of 2012, the Nordland Research Institute had 40 employees.

Nordland Research is a national research profile with a regional basis. It performs research and development work on behalf of the Research Council of Norway, national and regional governments, the European Union and private industries. Nordland Research Institute has several key funders. They are mainly funded by the Research Council of Norway and are paid by various state, national, and international clients. The institute has increased the number of research projects funded by the county, local authorities in and outside Nordland, and local government organizations.

== History ==
The Nordland Research Institute was established in 1979 and was for the first 30 years owned by Nordland county. On January 1, 2010, Nordland Research Institute was established as its own corporation. Nordland Research Institute has its offices at the University of Nordland, which, through time, has been convenient for Nordland Research Institute considering their cooperation with the University. Nordland Research Institute has grown regularly because the school has gained university status. Nordland Research Institute is one of 11 regional departments. Although the Nordland Research Institute is a minor institute compared to some other Norwegian institutions, it is still very visible in the research market. Through political jobs, welfare and research on experience-based tourism, which the department is very big on, they have gained recognition from many sides, including the King.

== The most important research areas in 2012 ==
- Resource management, environment and climate:

The use and protection of natural resources and cultural heritage management regimes, participation in administrative processes, environmental and climate policy, vulnerability and adaptability to climate change.

- Research on welfare, social inclusion and employment:

Research on disability situations in different areas of life, childcare services, rehabilitation, marginalization, mental health services, inclusive workplace, health, nursing and care services, municipal services' legitimacy and legal protection for particularly vulnerable groups.

- Education and School:

Implementing education reforms, classroom research, and educational and student participation has helped the institute build a portfolio of projects on language situations and teaching targeted to the Sámi population.

- Entrepreneurship, innovation, enterprise and business development:

Company establishment, innovation in enterprises and innovation systems, resource-based industries experience industries and service sectors, business-related funding, and industrial and regional policy.

- Culture and nature-based industries and regional development:

Use of culture and nature as a basis for economic development and local community development, tourism and experience industries, innovation and strategy in agriculture and aquaculture, regional business and community development, relationship center - periphery and development of communities.

== The new child-protection services ==
The new child-protection services are a collaboration project between research, education and practice fields in Bodø, Rana, Sandnes, Stavanger, Kristiansand, Vestre Toten, Ringerike, Central Namdalingen, Midtbyen (Trondheim), Heimdal, and Molde. This project's main objective is to identify knowledge about who the users of child welfare services are and what type of activities happen in the services. The project will answer the questions of who the users of child welfare services are, the needs of users, and how child welfare services meet these needs. In addition, the project focuses on children's mental health after interacting with child-protection services, as well as cooperation between municipal child welfare and the BUP. Also, the goal is to initiate professional development in areas that local authorities consider appropriate forums to develop better practices for users of municipal services for children and young people.
