= Space Camp Turkey =

Educational camp in İzmir, Turkey

Space Camp Turkey is an educational camp located in İzmir, Turkey. Its goal is to teach camp members about math and science. It is the only space camp in the Middle East. Thousands of kids attend the camp every year. The camp opened in 2000.

== See also ==
- Space Camp (United States)
- Space Camp Spain
- European Space Camp
