= SpaceCamp =

1986 film by Harry Winer

- Theatrical release poster
- Directed by: Harry Winer
- Screenplay by: Clifford Green; Casey T. Mitchell
- Story by: Patrick Bailey; Larry B. Williams
- Produced by: Patrick Bailey; Walter Coblenz
- Starring: Kate Capshaw; Lea Thompson; Kelly Preston; Larry B. Scott; Leaf Phoenix; Tate Donovan; Tom Skerritt
- Cinematography: William A. Fraker
- Edited by: Tim Board; John W. Wheeler
- Music by: John Williams
- Production company: ABC Motion Pictures
- Distributed by: 20th Century Fox
- Release date: June 6, 1986 (United States)
- Running time: 107 minutes
- Country: United States
- Language: English
- Budget: $18 million or $25 million
- Box office: $9,697,739 (United States)

SpaceCamp is a 1986 American science fiction adventure film inspired by the U.S. Space Camp in Huntsville, Alabama. Directed by Harry Winer, story by Patrick Bailey and Larry B. Williams, screenplay by Clifford Green (as W. W. Wicket) and Casey T. Mitchell, the film stars Kate Capshaw, Kelly Preston, Larry B. Scott, Lea Thompson, Tate Donovan, and Joaquin Phoenix (credited as "Leaf Phoenix") in his feature film debut.

SpaceCamp received mixed reviews and is famous for being a "marketing nightmare," as it was released less than five months after the Space Shuttle Challenger accident of January 28, 1986 (although filming was completed before the disaster occurred). At the time of release, some thought the movie was trying to capitalize on the shuttle tragedy and should never have been released. However, those associated with SpaceCamp disagreed and added they had taken extra care to avoid any appearance of exploiting a national tragedy.

SpaceCamp was released by 20th Century Fox in the United States on June 6, 1986. The film performed poorly at the box office, grossing less than $10 million in the US. The script was later adapted into a novel, which included references to the Challenger disaster and some of the kids' decisions to attend Space Camp in the wake of said tragedy.

== Plot ==
Four teenagers – Kevin, Kathryn, Rudy, and Tish – and 12-year-old Max, go to Space Camp for three weeks during the summer to learn about the NASA space program and mimic astronaut training. They meet their instructor, Andie Bergstrom, a NASA-trained astronaut who is frustrated that she has not been assigned to a Space Shuttle mission. Her bitterness is compounded by the fact that her husband, camp director Zach Bergstrom, is an astronaut who has walked on the Moon.

Max befriends a robot named Jinx, which was deemed unsuitable for space work because it overheated and was overly literal. Kathryn declares her dream to become the first female Shuttle commander and is frustrated when Andie assigns that role to Kevin instead to teach him responsibility. Kevin pursues Kathryn romantically, Rudy shares his wish to open the first fast food franchise on the Moon, and Tish reveals that despite appearing to be a valley girl, she is a genius with a photographic memory.

Kathryn and Kevin sneak away for romance near the launch pad, but Jinx unintentionally gives them away. Andie explains that she believes Kathryn has what it takes to accomplish her ambition and explains the necessity of the harsh treatment she is giving her.

Kevin takes out his anger on Max. Upset, Max states, "...I wish I was in space." Jinx overhears and takes what Max said literally. The campers are allowed to sit in the Space Shuttle Atlantis during a routine engine test. Jinx secretly enters NASA's computer room and triggers a "thermal curtain failure," causing one of the boosters to ignite during the test. In order to avoid a crash, Launch Control ignites the second booster and launches the Shuttle.

The Shuttle is not flight ready, has no long-range radio, and has insufficient on-board oxygen to last to the re-entry window at Edwards Air Force Base. Andie takes the Shuttle to the partially constructed Space Station Daedalus to retrieve oxygen stored there. Realizing that while they have no voice communications with NASA they do have telemetry, Tish uses a switch to send a morse code signal to NASA, but it is not noticed by ground control.

Andie is too big to reach the oxygen cylinders, so Max suits up for an EVA. During a critical moment, he panics until Kevin, knowing that Max is a fan of Star Wars, begins calling him "Luke" and tells him to "use the Force", which calms him enough to complete the mission.

In the Shuttle, Rudy attempts to decipher the technical schematics to work out how to feed the oxygen into the Shuttle's tanks. His lack of confidence combined with the time pressure frustrates Kathryn, who gives Andie instructions that conflict with Rudy's. Andie follows Rudy's correct instructions. Kathryn's self-confidence is shaken as she realizes her interference nearly caused disaster.

The second oxygen tank malfunctions, injuring Andie. Unaware of this, Ground Control begins the autopilot sequence to land the Shuttle – closing the bay doors and stranding Andie outside. She regains consciousness and urges them to leave her and take the re-entry window, as the Shuttle does not have enough oxygen to make the next window. Kathryn is unable to make a decision, but Kevin overrides the autopilot, enabling Max to rescue Andie. Having missed the Edwards re-entry window, the crew comes up with a plan to land at White Sands, New Mexico, after Rudy recalls the 1982 Space Shuttle mission that landed there. Tish uses Morse Code to signal NASA to let them land there.

At Ground Control, Jinx brings the signal to Zach's attention, and they prepare for the White Sands landing. With Andie injured, Kathryn fulfills her role as Shuttle Pilot, but doubts her abilities until Kevin cajoles her into guiding Atlantis through re-entry and landing it at White Sands.

== Cast ==
- Kate Capshaw as Andie Bergstrom, a camp instructor and astronaut.
- Tom Skerritt as Zach Bergstrom, the camp director, "flown" astronaut, and Andie's husband.
- Tate Donovan as Kevin Donaldson. Kevin is initially arrogant and selfish until Andie assigns him the role of Commander to teach him responsibility, much to Kathryn's dismay.
- Lea Thompson as Kathryn Fairly, who idolizes Andie and wants to be the first female shuttle commander. However, she is assigned the pilot role.
- Larry B. Scott as Rudy Tyler. Rudy loves science, but admits he is sometimes not very good at it.
- Kelly Preston as Tish Ambrosé. In many ways a typical valley girl teenager, Tish is also highly intelligent and has an eidetic memory.
- Leaf Phoenix as Max Graham, an eager 12-year-old boy who has been to Junior Camp twice, whom Andie finally allows to stay at the main camp. He frequently makes references to Star Wars.
- Frank Welker as the voice of Jinx, a sentient robot who befriends Max. Jinx facilitates the group's launch into space and then helps rescue them by discovering Tish's telemetry in Morse code. Jinx takes everything literally.

== Production ==
The film was made in the summer of 1985. It was the last film made by ABC Motion Pictures which was closed down in October 1985.

The film was Harry Winer's feature film directorial debut.

Lea Thompson mentioned in an interview that after their first day of shooting, they were ten days behind schedule, and what was supposed to be a three-month shoot became six. She also mentioned that "We had T-shirts printed up that said, 'SpaceCamp: It's Not Just A Movie, It's A Career.' Oh, actually, instead of SpaceCamp, it said SpaceCramp."

== Release ==
SpaceCamp was released in theaters on June 6, 1986. The Space Shuttle Challenger disaster delayed its original release.

=== Home media ===
It was released on DVD on September 25, 2001, on Anchor Bay Entertainment and later re-released in 2004 under MGM Home Entertainment. On September 26, 2017, Kino Classics released the film on Blu-ray.

== Reception ==
SpaceCamp received mixed reviews with 53% of critics giving it positive reviews on Rotten Tomatoes, based on 15 reviews. Critic Roger Ebert gave it a one and half star rating, saying that "Our thoughts about the Space Shuttle will never be the same again, and our memories are so painful that SpaceCamp is doomed even before it begins." Variety says that "SpaceCamp never successfully integrates summer camp hijinks with outer space idealism to come up with a dramatically compelling story", while James Sanford of the Kalamazoo Gazette responds "Not exactly out of this world".

== Legacy ==
In a 2012 interview with The A.V. Club, Lea Thompson mentioned that "I've had a lot of people come up to me and say that they became physicists or inventors, how much they loved that movie and how much it inspired them."

In 2016, in honor of the 30th anniversary of SpaceCamp's release, U.S. Space & Rocket Center inducted the film's cast into the Space Camp Hall of Fame.

== Remake ==
In January 2020, Disney announced that a remake was in the works for their streaming service Disney+. Mikey Day and Streeter Seidell have signed on to write the script and it will be produced by Walt Disney Pictures.

== See also ==
- List of films featuring space stations
- The Astronauts, a similarly themed television series about a group of children sent into space
