= Logemann =

Logemann is a surname. Notable people with the surname include:

- Logemann family
- George Logemann (1938–2012), American mathematician and computer scientist
- Jane Logemann, American artist
- Kenneth L. Logemann (1937–2013), American politician in Iowa
