= Connecticut's 36th House of Representatives district =

American legislative district

Connecticut's 36th State House of Representatives district
Representative
Renee LaMark Muir; D

Connecticut's 36th House of Representatives district elects one member of the Connecticut House of Representatives. It consists of Haddam, Chester, Essex, and Deep River. It has been represented by Democrat Renee LaMark Muir since 2025.

== List of representatives ==
List of representatives from Connecticut's 36th State House district
Representative	Party	Years	District home	Note
Charles J. LeClerc	Democratic	1967–1969	Bristol	Seat created
Woodrow T. Violette	Democratic	1969–1973	Bristol	
John J. Tiffany II	Republican	1973–1993	Lyme	
Alan Kyle	Republican	1993–1995	Lyme	
Claire Sauer	Democratic	1995–2001	Lyme	
James Spallone	Democratic	2001–2013	Essex	
Philip J. Miller	Democratic	2013–2017	Ivoryton	
Robert W. Siegrist III	Republican	2017–2019	Higganum	
Christine Palm	Democratic	2019–2025	Chester	
Renee LaMark Muir	Democratic	2025–	Deep River	

== Recent elections ==
=== 2020 ===
2020 Connecticut State House of Representatives election, District 36
Party	Candidate	Votes	%
Democratic	Christine Palm (incumbent)	8,104	52.66
Republican	Robert Siegrist	6,609	42.95
Independent Party	Robert Siegrist	368	2.39
Working Families	Christine Palm (incumbent)	307	2.00
Total votes		15,388	100.00
Democratic hold			

=== 2018 ===
2018 Connecticut House of Representatives election, District 36
Party	Candidate	Votes	%
Democratic	Christine Palm	6,572	50.8
Republican	Robert Siegrist (Incumbent)	6,360	49.2
Total votes		12,932	100.00
Democratic gain from Republican			

=== 2016 ===
2018 Connecticut House of Representatives election, District 36
Party	Candidate	Votes	%
Republican	Robert Siegrist	6,975	51.15
Democratic	Phil Miller (Connecticut politician) (Incumbent)	6,662	48.85
Total votes		12,932	100.00
Republican gain from Democratic			

=== 2014 ===
2014 Connecticut House of Representatives election, District 36
Party	Candidate	Votes	%
Democratic	Phil Miller	5,522	54.00
Republican	Robert Siegrist	4,701	46.00
Total votes		10,223	100.00
Democratic hold			

=== 2012 ===
2012 Connecticut House of Representatives election, District 36
Party	Candidate	Votes	%
Democratic	Phil Miller (Incumbent)	7,090	57.00
Republican	Vincent A. Pacileo	5,355	43.00
Total votes		12,445	100.00
Democratic hold			
