= SLC Agrícola =

Brazilian agricultural company

- Type: Sociedade Anônima
- Traded as: B3: SLCE3
- Industry: Agribusiness
- Founded: 1977
- Headquarters: Porto Alegre, Brazil
- Key people: Eduardo Logemann, (Chairman); Aurélio Pavinato, (CEO)
- Products: Soybeans, Cotton, Corn, Coffee, Sugarcane, Wheat
- Revenue: US$663.8 million (2017)
- Net income: US$111.4 million (2017)
- Number of employees: 2,252
- Parent: Grupo SLC (SLC Group)
- Subsidiaries: LandCo
- Website: www.slcagricola.com.br

SLC Agrícola (Schneider Logemann & Cia, B3: SLCE3) is one of the largest Brazilian agricultural producers, founded in 1977 by the SLC Group. It focuses on cotton, soybean, and corn. The business is controlled by the Logemann family. It was the first company of its sector (grains and cotton) whose shares were traded in a Stock Exchange. The company operates 16 farms in six Brazilian states, totaling 460,600 hectares (1,138,000 acres) in the 2014–15, marketing year – 260,900 hectares (645,000 acres) of which were planted with soybean, 98,500 with cotton, 43,400 with corn, and 18,100 with other crops, including coffee, wheat, corn seed, and sugarcane. Its biggest competitor is Vanguarda Agro.

The company headquarters is Santana, Porto Alegre, Rio Grande do Sul, Brazil.

The firm has attracted international attention for its part in the deforestation of the Cerrado region of Brazil and conflicts with traditional communities over land rights.

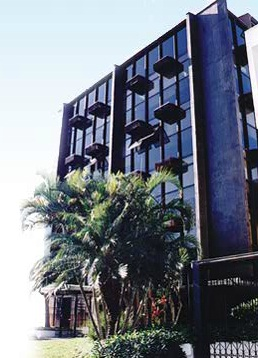
SLC Agricola headquarters in Porto Alegre, Brazil

== History ==
SLC logo

SLC Agricola was founded in 1977 with the acquisition of two farms in the South Region of Brazil in Rio Grande do Sul, where soybeans, corn, and wheat were planted. In the agribusiness for 70 years, SLC Group started as an industry in 1945, in Horizontina, southern Brazil, producing tractors and combines, and creating a joint venture with John Deere in 1979, which lasted for 20 years. In 1980, SLC Agrícola bought the first farm in the cerrado biome: Pamplona Farm in Goiás State.

=== SLC Group ===
SLC Group was founded in 1945, in the city of Horizontina, State of Rio Grande do Sul, by three families of German immigrants, among them the families of Balduino Schneider and Frederico Jorge Logemann.

The SLC Group founded the first Brazilian harvester manufacturing industry. It has an over-28-year relationship with John Deere, including a joint venture for manufacturing harvesters and tractors from 1979 to 1999.

In 2007, SLC Agrícola goes public, starting to trade its shares on the Bovespa.

In 2013, it concludes another joint venture with the companies Dois Vales and Mitsui from Japan.

In 2021, the company Terra Santa, located in Mato Grosso, is incorporated for R$753 million. The deal added six farms to SLC Agrícola's units and expanded its production capacity by another 145,000 hectares.

== Land distribution ==
SLC Agrícola holds 460,600 hectares (1,138,000 acres) of farmable land worth R$2.376 billion. That area is distributed through 16 farms, and each farm name starts with P and has 8 letters. Three of SLC's farms (Planeste, Panorama, and Piratini) are controlled by SLC Agrícola's subsidiary LandCo. Two other farms (Perdizes and Paladino) are farmed by SLC Agricola through a joint venture with Mitsui Co., while Pioneira is farmed in collaboration with Dois Vales Group.

Farms:

1. Perdizes – 16,798 hectares (41,510 acres) (joint venture with Mitsui Co.)
2. Paiaguás – 54,847 hectares (135,530 acres)
3. Planorte – 28,779 hectares (71,110 acres)
4. Pamplona – 18,637 hectares (46,050 acres)
5. Planalto – 20,195 hectares (49,900 acres)
6. Pioneira – 20,088 hectares (49,640 acres) (joint venture with Dois Vales Group)
7. Planeste – 41,209 hectares (101,830 acres) (LandCo.)
8. Parnaíba – 54,020 hectares (133,500 acres)
9. Parnaguá – 8,528 hectares (21,070 acres)
10. Paineira – 5,025 hectares (12,420 acres)
11. Parceiro – 11,206 hectares (27,690 acres)
12. Paladino – 21,906 hectares (54,130 acres) (joint venture with Mitsui Co.)
13. Palmares – 33,478 hectares (82,730 acres)
14. Panorama – 21,991 hectares (54,340 acres) (LandCo.)
15. Piratini – 13,327 hectares (32,930 acres) (LandCo.)

== Research units ==
Each SLC farm is equipped with a research unit, where the main research topics are fertilizing systems; soil handling systems; competition between soy cultivation, cotton cultivation, and corn hybrids; plantation seasons and rehearsals of evaluation of fungicides efficiency, insecticides, and herbicides. There experiments simulate the real land conditions and are conducted scientifically. SLC Agrícola performs 190 yearly land tests, and such tests happen in an area of 1.3 hectares (3.2 acres).

== Cultivation rotation system ==
The cultivation rotation systems between soy, cotton, and corn is effectively utilized within all of SLC Agrícola's farms and provides several benefits to the productive system, along with spreading the fixed costs.

The use of this technique helps the farms have better control over infective plants, fewer outbreaks of pests and diseases on the fields, and better usage of the machinery and crew.

== Soil management ==
SLC Agrícola adopted a no-till system with the goal of significantly reducing the levels soil loss, water loss, and nutrients loss. With this system in place, it became possible to reduce the production costs through the reduction of machine operations in the fields and the conservation of soil and nutrients, which consequently reduced the need for heavy and expensive fertilization. The system provides long-term increase in productive potential of the cultivated plantations. The company believes that the sustainability of the productive system mainly depends on the correct management of the soil.

== Soy ==
SLC Agrícola is one of the biggest soy products of Brazil, with plans to plan 185,300 hectares (458,000 acres) in 2013–14. The company culottes soy in the main agricultural regions of Brazil, and its production is commercialized to both national and international markets.

Soy is the main supplier of vegetable protein used to feed humans and animals, and it is also broadly used as raw material for the production of oil and biofuels.

SLC Agrícola integrates the executive committee of Round Table on Responsible Soy Association, committed to making the value of soy more responsible and also to implementing a global system to promote production, processing, distribution, and consumption of responsible soy.

Productivity:

- 2013–14: 2.914 kilograms per hectare (2.600 lb/acre)
- 2014–15: 3.150 kilograms per hectare (2.810 lb/acre)

The area harvested until 30/04/2015 corresponds to 82% of the 206,900 hectares (511,000 acres) of cultivated soy.

== Deforestation ==
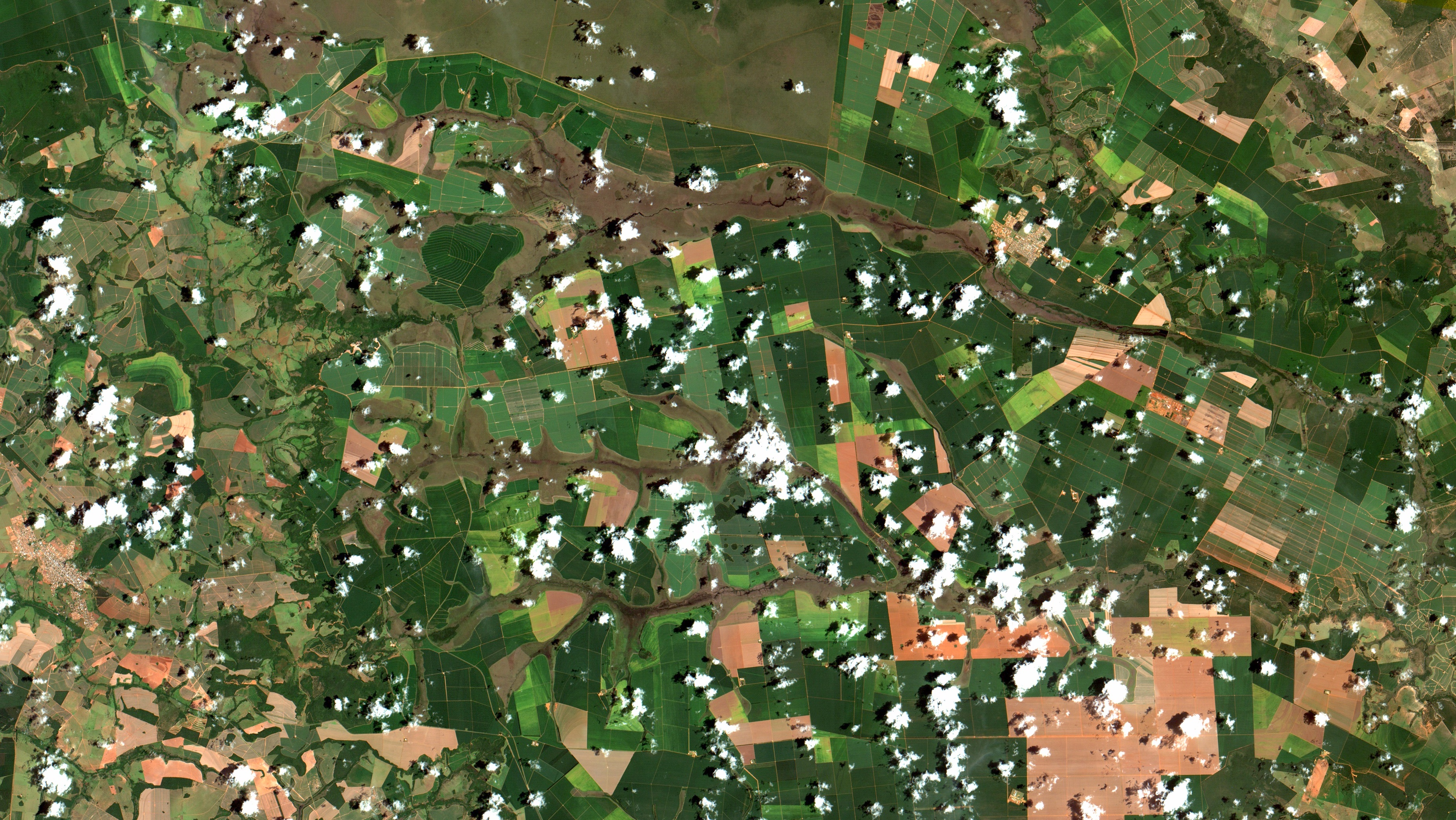
Deforestation of the Cerrado near Emas National Park

SLC Agrícola has come under scrutiny from the environmentalist non-profit organization Global Witness for its practices of large-scale deforestation, particularly in the Cerrado ecosystem of Brazil. Similarly, Chain Reaction Research also found that the firm has deforested much of the Cerrado, estimating that the firm has cleared 101.5 square kilometres (39.2 mi^{2}) for the production of soy. This figure was corroborated by SLC Agrícola, which admitted that it had cleared 110 square kilometres (42 mi^{2}) in 2020 alone, although the firm insists that said clearing was done legally. Nevertheless, SLC Agrícola denies it is deforesting the Cerrado, instead saying that it is simply removing "vegetation", and that its properties are not located on land with forests. Chain Reaction Research also condemned the firm for a "lack of zero-deforestation commitment".

In addition to criticism from non-profits, the Government Pension Fund of Norway has divested its holdings of SLC Agrícola due to the firm's large-scale deforestation.
