= SLC =

SLC may refer to:

== Places ==
- Salt Lake City, Utah, United States
  - IATA code for Salt Lake City International Airport
- South Lanarkshire Council, Scotland
- St. Lucie County, Florida, United States

== Education ==
- Sarah Lawrence College, New York
- School Leaving Certificate (Nepal)
- St. Lawrence College, Ontario, Canada
- Small Learning Community, a "school-within-a-school", especially in the United States
- Student Loans Company, United Kingdom
- SUNY Libraries Consortium, New York

== Science and technology ==
- Signaling line circuit, an addressable fire alarm circuit
- Single-level cell, a type of flash memory
- Solute carrier family of membrane transport proteins
- Stanford Linear Collider
- Subscriber loop carrier, providing telephone interface functionality
- Searchlight Control radar, UK, WWII
- Secondary lymphoid-tissue chemokine, a cytokine
- Slc., the abbreviation for the orchid genus × Sophrolaeliocattleya, a synonym of × Laeliocattleya
- Submarine laser communication

== Sports ==
- Southland Conference, south-central United States
- Southwestern Lacrosse Conference, United States
- Sri Lanka Cricket
- St. Louis City SC, Major League Soccer team in St. Louis, Missouri

== Other uses ==
- Saint Lucia Cross, of the Order of Saint Lucia
- Postal code for Santa Luċija, Malta
- Siluro Lenta Corsa ("slow-running torpedo" in Italian), an underwater assault vehicle by the Italian Navy in World War II.
- Sounds Like Chicken, a music group
- Suspended Looping Coaster, a roller coaster model
- SLC Agrícola, a Brazilian agribusiness company
- Mercedes-Benz SLC-Class of car
- Supreme Lanka Coalition, a political alliance in Sri Lanka
