= Beth Shalom Rodfe Zedek =

Reform synagogue in Connecticut, US

- Location in Connecticut Beth Shalom Rodfe Zedek (the United States)

Religion
- Affiliation: Reform Judaism
- Ecclesiastical or organisational status: Synagogue
- Leadership: Rabbi Marci L. Bellows
- Status: Active

Location
- Location: 55 East Kings Highway, Chester, Connecticut 06412
- Country: United States
- Coordinates: 41°25′00″N 72°26′24″W

Architecture
- Architects: Sol LeWitt; Stephen Lloyd
- Type: Synagogue
- Established: 1998 (as a merged congregation): 1915 (Rodfe Zedek); c. 1930s (Beth Israel)
- Completed: 1998

Website
- cbsrz.org

Beth Shalom Rodfe Zedek (transliterated from Hebrew as "House of Peace; Pursuers of Justice"), is a Reform Jewish congregation and synagogue, located at 55 East Kings Highway, in Chester, Connecticut, in the United States. The congregation is noted for the architecture of its "spectacular" building.

== History ==
Congregation Rodfe Zedek was founded in Moodus in 1905. The fledgling congregation purchased and worshipped in a small, eighteenth-century house before building its first, modest synagogue in 1915.

Congregation Beth Shalom was founded in the 1930s. Calling itself the Jewish Community Center of Middlesex County, it worshipped at first in the home of chicken farmer and founder Isadore Romanof, then in a room in the Deep River Public Library in Deep River. In 1942 the congregation purchased a former church building for use as a synagogue.

The two congregations merged in the 1990s and in 1998 began plans to build a new synagogue.

== Building ==
The congregation's building was designed by a congregation member, the noted artist Sol LeWitt in close collaboration with architect Stephen Lloyd. LeWitt conceived the "airy" synagogue building, with its shallow dome supported by "exuberant wooden roof beams" an homage to the Wooden synagogues of eastern Europe. The spacious foyer is designed to be used as an art gallery, and has hosted exhibits by contemporary artists including Jane Logemann.
