= Chester, Connecticut =

- Town
- Town of Chester
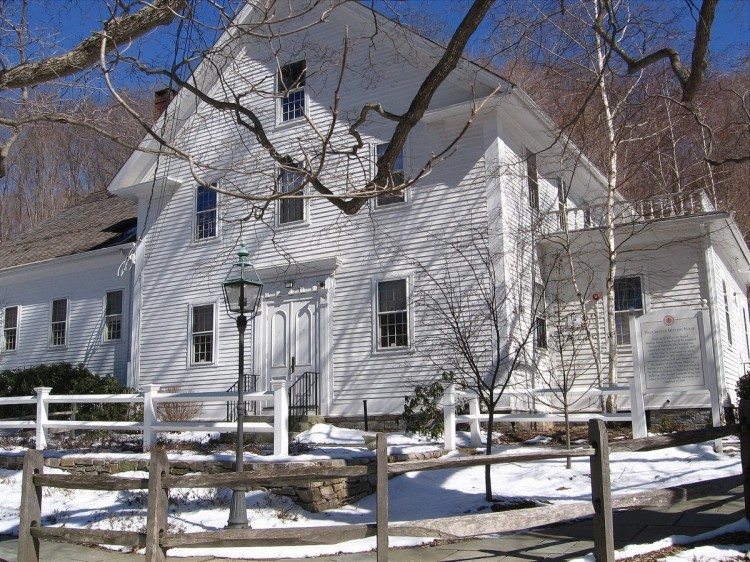
- The Old Town Hall

- Seal
- Interactive map of Chester, Connecticut
- Coordinates: 41°24′08″N 72°28′57″W
- Country: United States
- U.S. state: Connecticut
- County: Middlesex
- Region: Lower CT River Valley
- Incorporated: 1836

Government
  - Type: Selectman-town meeting
  - First Selectman: Cynthia Lignar (D)
  - Selectman: Patricia Bandzes (D)
  - Selectman: Paul Radicchi (R)
  - State Rep.: Renee LaMark Muir (D-36)
  - State Senator: Norman Needleman (D-33)

Area
  - Total: 16.8 sq mi (43.5 km^{2})
  - Land: 16.0 sq mi (41.5 km^{2})
  - Water: 0.81 sq mi (2.1 km^{2})
- Elevation: 377 ft (115 m)

Population (2020)
  - Total: 3,749
  - Density: 234/sq mi (90.3/km^{2})
- Time zone: UTC-5 (EST)
  - Summer (DST): UTC-4 (EDT)
- ZIP code: 06412
- Area codes: 860/959
- FIPS code: 09-14300
- GNIS feature ID: 0213407
- Website: chesterct.org

Chester is a town in Middlesex County, Connecticut, United States. The town is part of the Lower Connecticut River Valley Planning Region. The population was 3,749 at the 2020 census. The town center is defined by the U.S. Census Bureau as a census-designated place (CDP). The name is a transfer from Chester, in England.

== History ==
The area was home to a Native American (possibly Hammonasset) village named Pattaquonk. Pattaquonk was also the name and approximate location of a 30-acre Wangunk reservation established in 1662 as part of the English acquisition of the land encompassing Haddam and East Haddam, which was home to three Wangunk villages. English settlement of the area began in 1692. The town was formed from the northern quarter of Saybrook and incorporated in 1836.

In 1769, Jonathan Warner was granted permission to operate a ferry across the Connecticut River that became the Chester-Hadlyme Ferry, the second-oldest continuously operating ferry service in Connecticut. Its location is currently a state historical landmark.

== Geography ==
According to the United States Census Bureau, the town has a total area of 16.8 square miles (44 km^{2}), of which 16.0 square miles (41 km^{2}) is land and 0.8 square miles (2.1 km^{2}) (4.75%) is water. The CDP has a total area of 2.1 square miles (5.4 km^{2}) of which 1.46% is water.

== Demographics ==
Historical population
Census	Pop.	Note	%±
1840	974		—
1850	992		1.8%
1860	1,015		2.3%
1870	1,094		7.8%
1880	1,177		7.6%
1890	1,301		10.5%
1900	1,328		2.1%
1910	1,419		6.9%
1920	1,675		18.0%
1930	1,463		−12.7%
1940	1,676		14.6%
1950	1,920		14.6%
1960	2,520		31.3%
1970	2,982		18.3%
1980	3,068		2.9%
1990	3,417		11.4%
2000	3,743		9.5%
2010	3,994		6.7%
2020	3,749		−6.1%
U.S. Decennial Census

At the 2000 census there were 3,743 people, 1,510 households, and 1,005 families living in the town. The population density was 233.5 inhabitants per square mile (90.2/km^{2}). There were 1,613 housing units at an average density of 100.6 per square mile (38.8/km^{2}). The racial makeup of the town was 96.79% White, 0.85% African American, 0.35% Native American, 0.83% Asian, 0.05% Pacific Islander, 0.24% from other races, and 0.88% from two or more races. Hispanic or Latino people of any race were 1.71%.

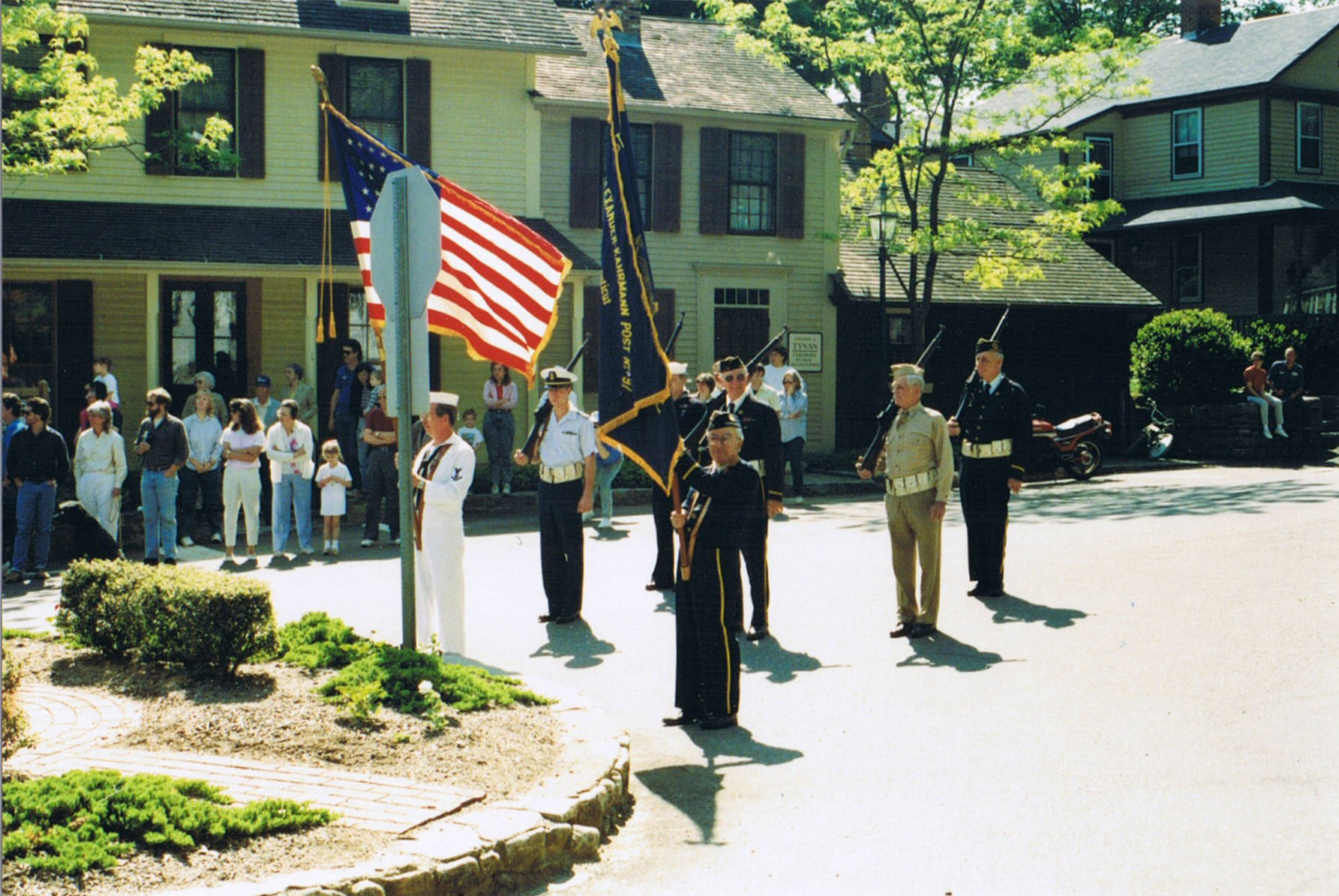
Memorial Day ceremony in Chester, 1990

Of the 1,510 households, 29.7% had children under the age of 18 living with them, 56.9% were married couples living together, 7.0% had a female householder with no husband present, and 33.4% were non-families. 28.1% of households were one person, and 13.0% were one person aged 65 or older. The average household size was 2.38 and the average family size was 2.93.

The age distribution was 22.3% under the age of 18, 4.4% from 18 to 24, 30.1% from 25 to 44, 26.1% from 45 to 64, and 17.2% 65 or older. The median age was 42 years. For every 100 females, there were 91.6 males.

The median household income was $65,156 and the median family income was $79,941. Males had a median income of $45,515 versus $40,444 for females. The per capita income for the town was $32,191. None of the families and 1.3% of the population were living below the poverty line, including no under eighteens and 2.6% of those over 64.

=== CDP ===
At the 2000 census, there were 1,546 people, 632 households, and 401 families living in the Chester Center CDP. The population density was 762.1 inhabitants per square mile (294.2 inhabitants/km^{2}). There were 669 housing units at an average density of 329.8 per square mile (127.3/km^{2}). The racial makeup of the CDP was 96.31% White, 1.29% African American, 0.06% Native American, 1.36% Asian, 0.06% from other races, and 0.91% from two or more races. Hispanic or Latino of any race were 1.29% of the population.

Of the 632 households, 30.4% had children under the age of 18 living with them, 53.8% were married couples living together, 6.6% had a female householder with no husband present, and 36.4% were non-families. 30.5% of households were one person, and 10.1% were one person aged 65 or older. The average household size was 2.32 and the average family size was 2.91.

The age distribution was 21.9% under the age of 18, 4.9% from 18 to 24, 31.8% from 25 to 44, 26.1% from 45 to 64, and 15.4% 65 or older. The median age was 41 years. For every 100 females, there were 93.0 males. For every 100 females age 18 and over, there were 94.8 males.

The median household income was $64,236 and the median family income was $71,250. Males had a median income of $38,900 versus $46,354 for females. The per capita income for the CDP was $32,087. None of the families and 0.5% of the population were living below the poverty line, including no under eighteens and none of those over 64.

Voter registration and party enrollment as of October 31, 2024
Party	Active voters	Inactive voters	Total voters	Percentage
Democratic	1,162	81	1,243	39.37%
Republican	565	37	602	19.07%
Unaffiliated	1,139	129	1,268	40.16%
Minor parties	38	6	44	1.39%
Total	2,904	253	3,157	100%

Presidential election results
Year	Democratic	Republican	Third parties
2024	64.6% 1,666	33.6% 866	1.8% 47
2020	65.5% 1,701	32.9% 853	1.6% 42
2016	60.2% 1,365	34.4% 781	5.4% 123
2012	65.4% 1,380	33.5% 707	1.1% 22
2008	67.5% 1,527	31.4% 710	1.1% 25
2004	62.1% 1,375	35.9% 796	2.0% 43
2000	58.7% 1,207	34.1% 701	7.2% 149
1996	56.9% 1,089	28.0% 536	15.1% 289
1992	45.1% 924	26.0% 533	28.9% 593
1988	48.6% 821	49.6% 838	1.8% 31
1984	38.4% 637	61.1% 1,015	0.5% 8
1980	37.3% 578	47.0% 729	15.7% 244
1976	45.4% 671	54.2% 800	0.4% 6
1972	36.8% 552	62.1% 931	1.1% 17
1968	44.3% 549	51.5% 638	4.2% 53
1964	64.1% 802	35.9% 450	0.00% 0
1960	41.9% 544	58.1% 754	0.00% 0
1956	33.4% 413	66.6% 825	0.00% 0

== Education ==
Chester, like the other two towns in the "tri-town area" (Essex and Deep River), is a member of Regional School District #4. John Winthrop Junior High School is on Warsaw Street in Deep River, and Valley Regional High School, is on Kelsey Hill in Deep River. They serve students in grades 7–8 and 9–12, respectively. Each town in the area also has their own elementary school, serving grades K–6.

== Media ==
The 1959 film It Happened to Jane, starring Doris Day and Jack Lemmon, was filmed in Chester. Portions of the 1971 horror film Let's Scare Jessica to Death were filmed in Chester, including the Chester–Hadlyme Ferry.

== Points of interest ==
- The Beth Shalom Rodfe Zedek synagogue is noted for the architecture of its "spectacular" building.
- Goodspeed-at-Chester, Goodspeed Musicals' second theatre
- The Chester Museum at the Mill, a museum of the Chester Historical Society
- The Chester–Hadlyme Ferry is the second oldest continuously operating ferry service in the state of Connecticut and is a designated state historical landmark.
- Camp Hazen YMCA

=== On the National Register of Historic Places ===
- Charles Daniels House – 43 Liberty Street (added March 19, 1988)
- Dr. Ambrose Pratt House – Pratt Street (added December 9, 1972)
- Jonathan Warner House – 47 Kings Highway (added 1978)
- Old Town Hall – on the green between Liberty Street and Goose Hill Road (added March 23, 1972)
- Villa Bella Vista – 7 Old Depot Road (added 2000)

== Duck Race ==
The town holds a rubber duck race annually to fundraise for local charities. The tradition has been ongoing for 11 years as of 2025; the race for that year was called the "Conn-Ducky Derby", a pun on "Kentucky Derby" (which happened on the same day).

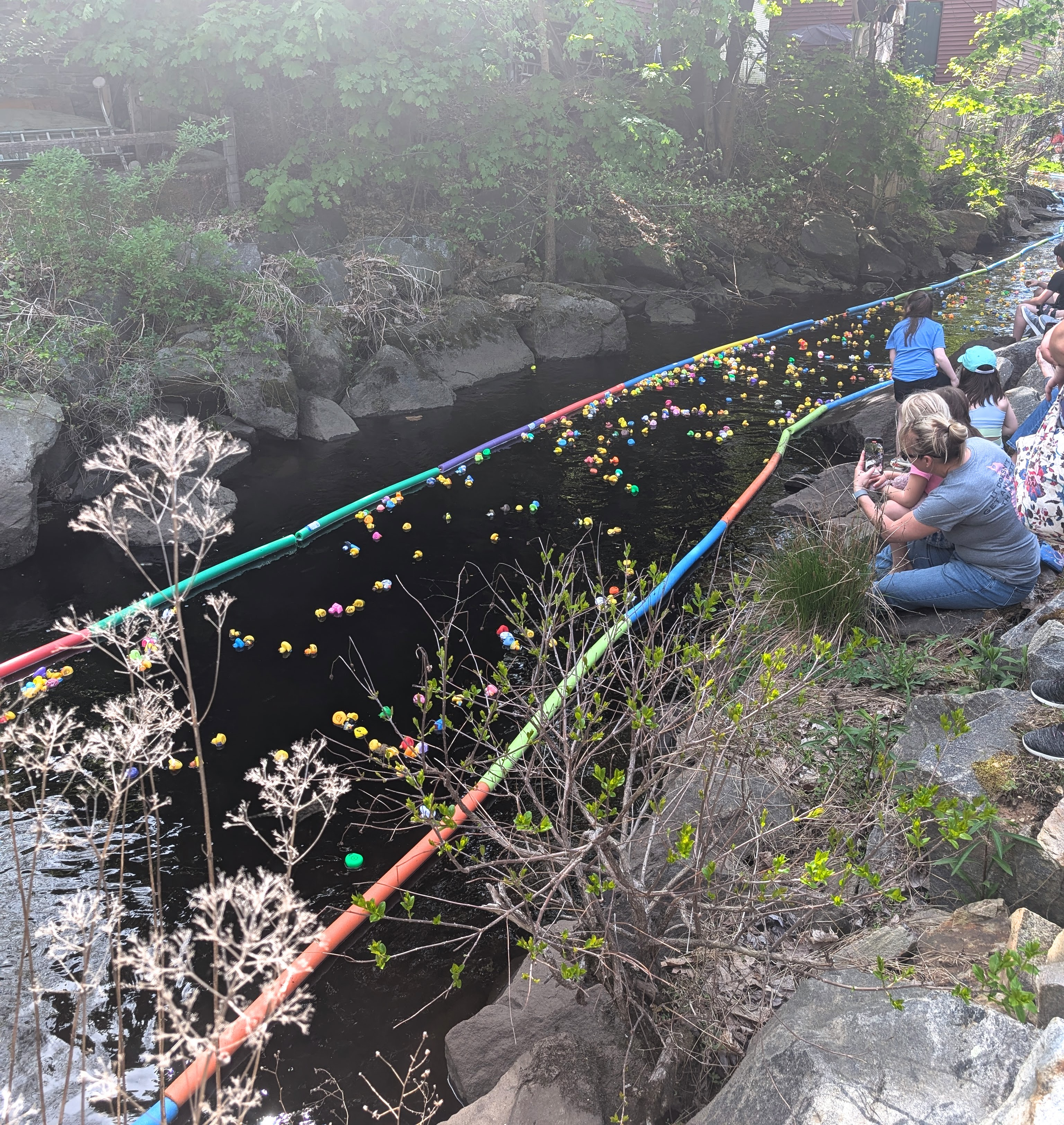
Chester Duck Race, 2025

== Industry ==
The Whelen Engineering Company, a major designer and distributor of public service warning equipment (warning lights, sirens, etc.) in North America, is headquartered in Chester.

== Transportation ==
=== Air ===
The Chester Airport is a local facility with one paved runway. It is privately owned by Whelen Aviation.

=== Ground ===
The Estuary Transit District provides public transportation throughout Chester and the surrounding towns through its 9 Town Transit Service. Services include connections to the Old Saybrook Train Station, served by Amtrak and Shoreline East railroads.

== Notable people ==
- Constance Baker Motley (1921–2005), civil rights leader
- Art Carney (1918–2003), actor; resident, died in town
- Paul Hopkins (1904–2004), major league relief pitcher; born in town
- Sol LeWitt (1928–2007), artist
- Michael P. Price (born 1938), theatre producer and artistic director
- Morley Safer (1931–2016), CBS news correspondent and anchor on 60 Minutes
- Max Showalter (1917–2000), film and television actor; retired to Chester
- Washington F. Willcox (1834–1909), US Congressman; resident

== Pictures of Chester ==
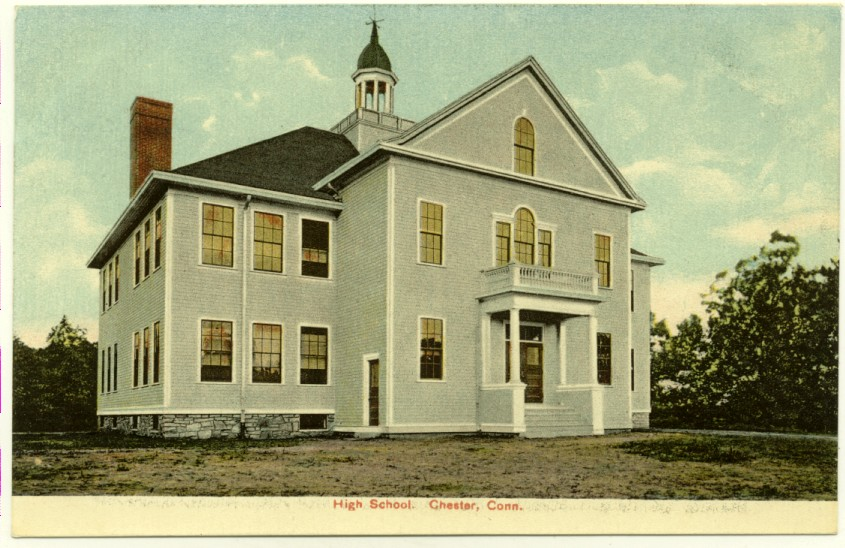
Chester High School, c. 1906–1916

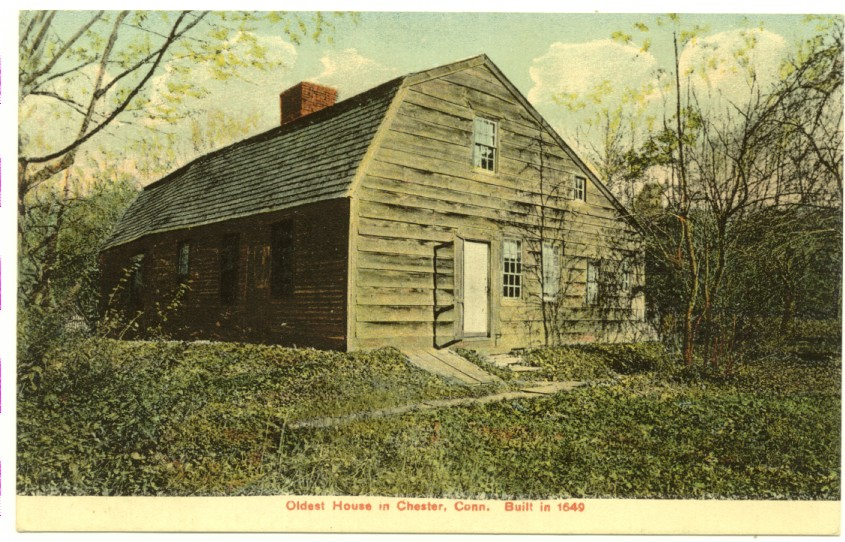
Oldest house in Chester, built 1649 (picture c. 1906–1916)

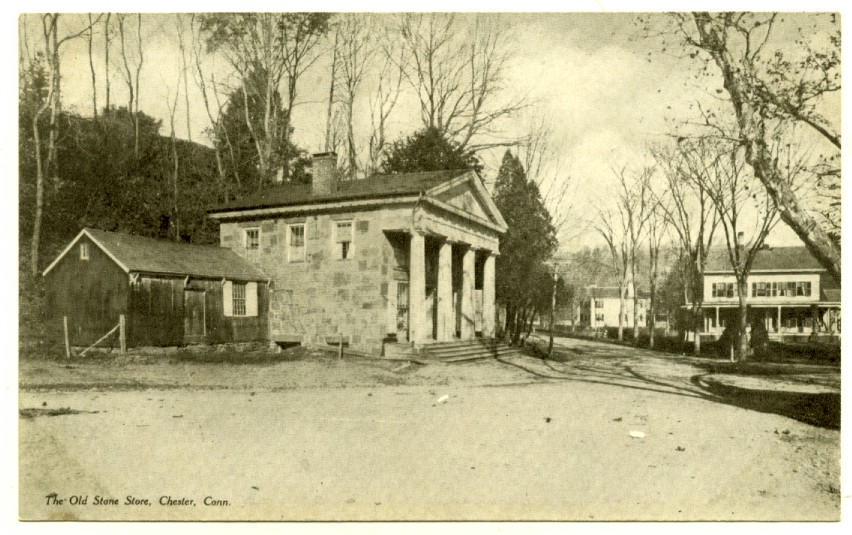
Old Stone Store, c. 1901–1907

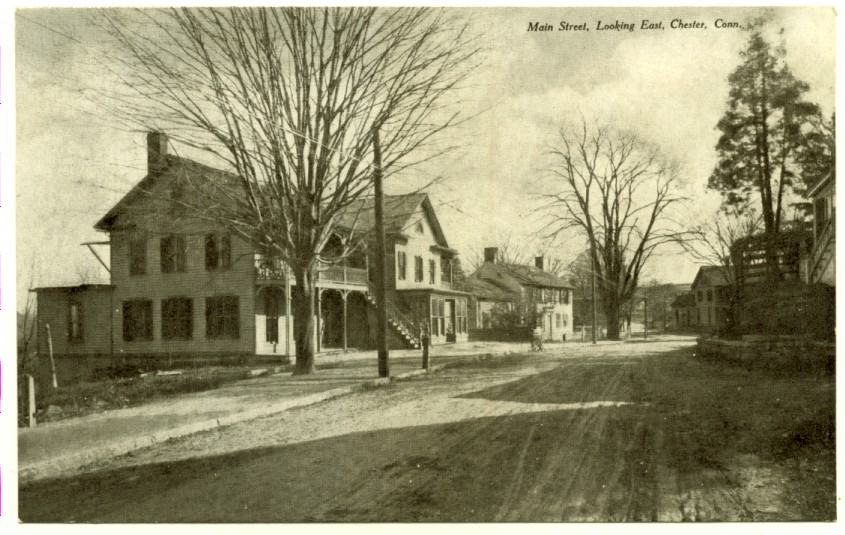
Main Street, looking east, c. 1901–1907
