= Dr. Ambrose Pratt House =

Historic house in Connecticut, United States

- U.S. National Register of Historic Places
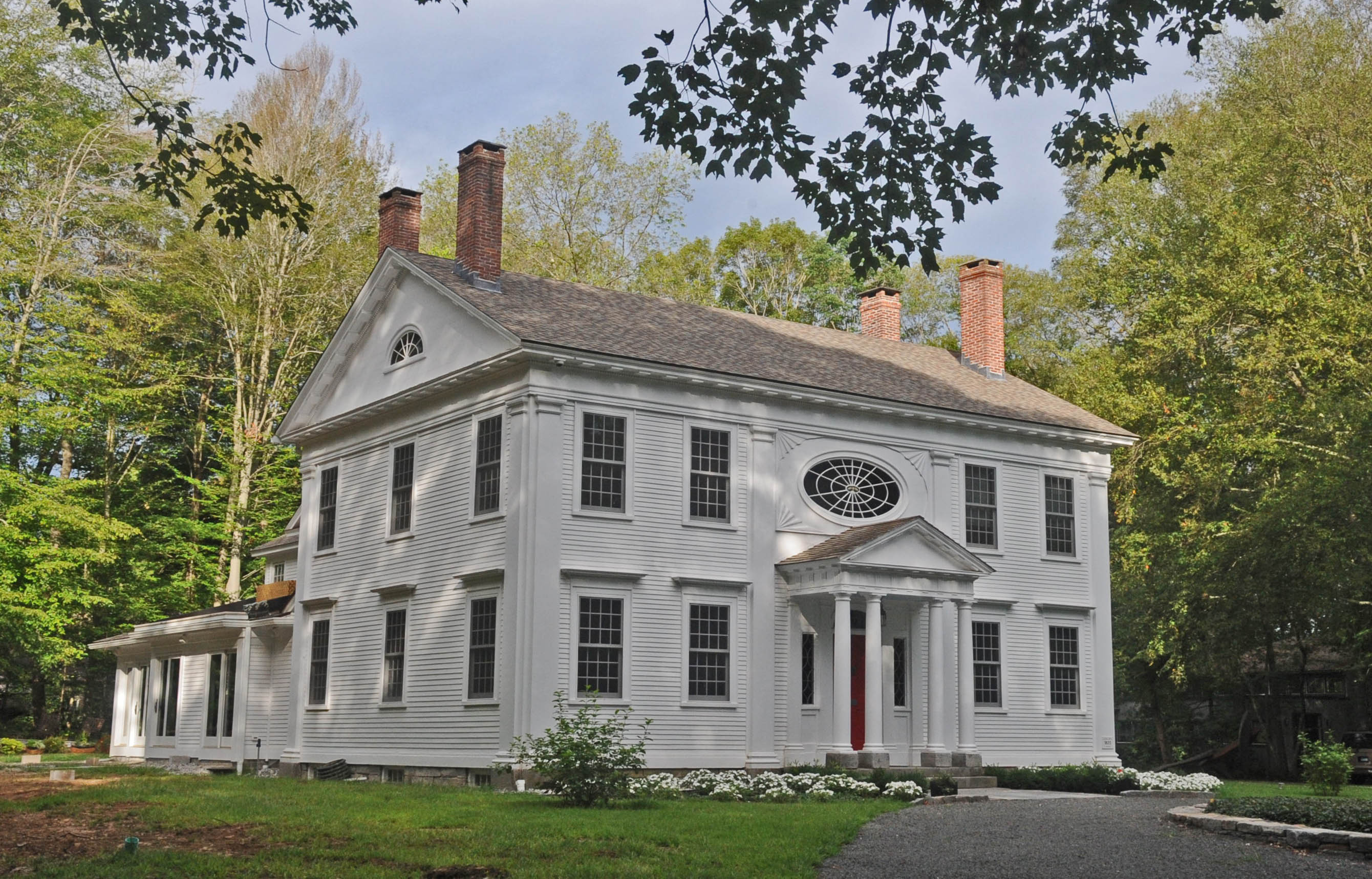
- In 2016

- Location within Connecticut Location within the United States
- Location: Pratt Street, Chester, Connecticut
- Coordinates: 41°24′1″N 72°26′43″W
- Area: 3 acres (1.2 ha)
- Built: 1820
- Architect: Sillman, Samuel; Bush, Fenner
- Architectural style: Federal
- NRHP reference No.: 72001311
- Added to NRHP: November 9, 1972

The Dr. Ambrose Pratt House is a historic house on Pratt Street in Chester, Connecticut. Built in 1820, it is a fine example of high-style Federal architecture, with a long history of associate with the locally prominent Pratt family. The house was listed on the National Register of Historic Places in 1972.

== Description and history ==
The Dr. Ambrose Pratt House is located in a secluded setting at the end of Pratt Street. This is not its original location, which was facing nearby Connecticut Route 154; it was moved from that location, with its foundation and chimney, in 1966. It is a 2 1/2-story wood-frame structure, five bays wide, with a side-gable roof and a large central chimney. It has an imposing Federal style facade, where the central bay is dominated by a large oval spider-glass window above the entrance. The main entry is sheltered by a portico supported by paired Doric columns, with small modillions lining the fully pedimented gable. The entry is flanked by sidelight windows and pilasters, which echo pilasters at the building corners. The doorway is topped by a semi-oval fanlight window, as are the sidelights. The interior has well-preserved high-quality woodwork.

The house was built in 1820 for Abram Mitchell, a local man who apparently made a small fortune speculating on Continental currency after the American Revolutionary War. The principal builder was Samuel Silliman, a locally well-known master carver. The house belonged to members of the locally prominent Pratt family for many years. Dr. Ambrose Pratt was given the house in 1844 by his father-in-law at the time of his marriage.

== See also ==
- National Register of Historic Places listings in Middlesex County, Connecticut
