= Jeanne F. Spallone =

American journalist and politician (1928–2008)

Jeanne Field Spallone

Member of the Connecticut House of Representatives from Deep River
- In office 1959–1961 Serving with Ernest Nucci
- Preceded by: John E. Larson; Helen LaPlace
- Succeeded by: Ernest Nucci; George W. Whelen

Personal details
- Born: January 18, 1928
- Died: August 5, 2008 (aged 80)
- Party: Democratic
- Spouse: Daniel Spallone (m. 1950; died 2007)
- Children: 3, including James Spallone

Jeanne Field Spallone (January 18, 1928 – August 5, 2008) was an American judge, journalist, and state legislator in Connecticut.

== Personal life and education ==
Jeanne Carol Field was a native of New York City, born to parents Flora Kopp Field and Charles William Field. Field attended New York University before transferring to the University of Connecticut, from which she graduated in 1950. She was married, in 1950, to Daniel F. Spallone, who later became a judge of the Connecticut Appellate Court. James Spallone is their son. The Spallone family resided in Deep River, Connecticut, and from 1962, spent summers at Block Island.

== Political career ==
Jeanne Spallone became an assistant to Chester Bowles, was a member of the Deep River Democratic Town Committee for five decades, and sought election to the Connecticut House of Representatives three times, serving from 1959 to 1961. Throughout the 1950s to the 1970s, Spallone was a journalist for The Middletown Press and authored a book on local history titled A Watch to Keep about American Revolutionary War veterans. Between 1978 and 1994, Spallone was an elected probate judge. At the time of her death on August 5, 2008, Spallone was working on a children's book.
