= Old Town Hall (Chester, Connecticut) =

- U.S. National Register of Historic Places
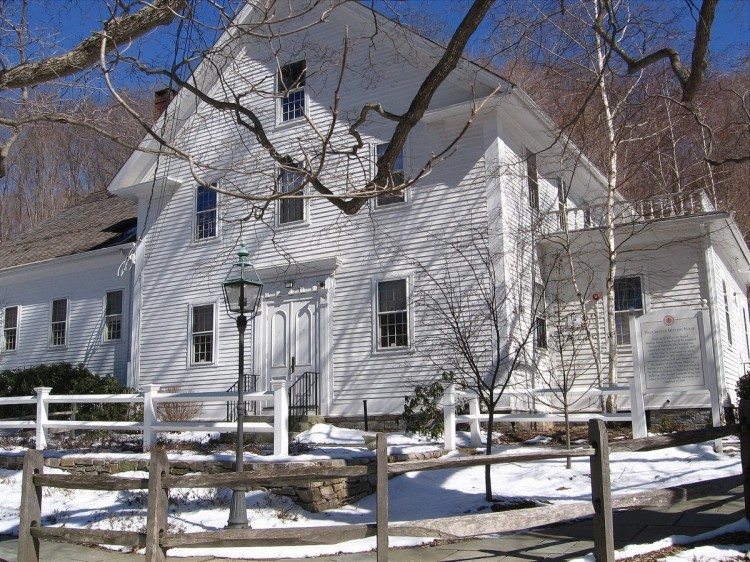

- Location within Connecticut Location within the United States
- Location: On the green between Liberty Street and Goose Hill Road, Chester, Connecticut
- Coordinates: 41°24′25″N 72°27′9″W
- Area: 1 acre (0.40 ha)
- Built: 1793-1794
- NRHP reference No.: 72001310
- Added to NRHP: February 23, 1972

The Old Town Hall is a historic public building on Chester Green in Chester, Connecticut. Built in 1793 and subsequently altered and enlarged, it has been a significant civic meeting point for the community since its construction, hosting religious services, town meetings, and theatrical productions. It was listed on the National Register of Historic Places in 1972.

== Description and history ==
Chester's Old Town Hall is located at the town's traditional center, north of the modern main village. It is set at the north end of the Chester Green, between Liberty Street and Goose Hill Road. It is a 2-1/2 story timber-frame structure, with a clapboarded exterior and steeply pitched gable roof supported by trusses shaped out of heavy wooden timbers. The gabled ends of the building have formal entrances at their centers, which have Federal style surrounds, and are no longer used. There are single-story extensions projecting from both the north and south sides, one providing an enlarged entrance vestibule, and the other a stage area.

The structure was built in 1793 as a meeting house, principally to serve the local Congregational parish, which was then still part of Old Saybrook. It served as the meetinghouse for the Congregational Church until 1845 when a new Congregational Church was constructed on West Main Street. It was sold to the town of Chester (incorporated in 1836) in 1847 for $300, and used as the town hall to hold town meetings. In 1876, the building was substantially remodeled as a theater. Aside from its use for local theatrical events and high school graduations, the building continued to be used as the site for town meetings until 1960.

== See also ==
- National Register of Historic Places listings in Middlesex County, Connecticut
