= Logemann family =

Brazilian family

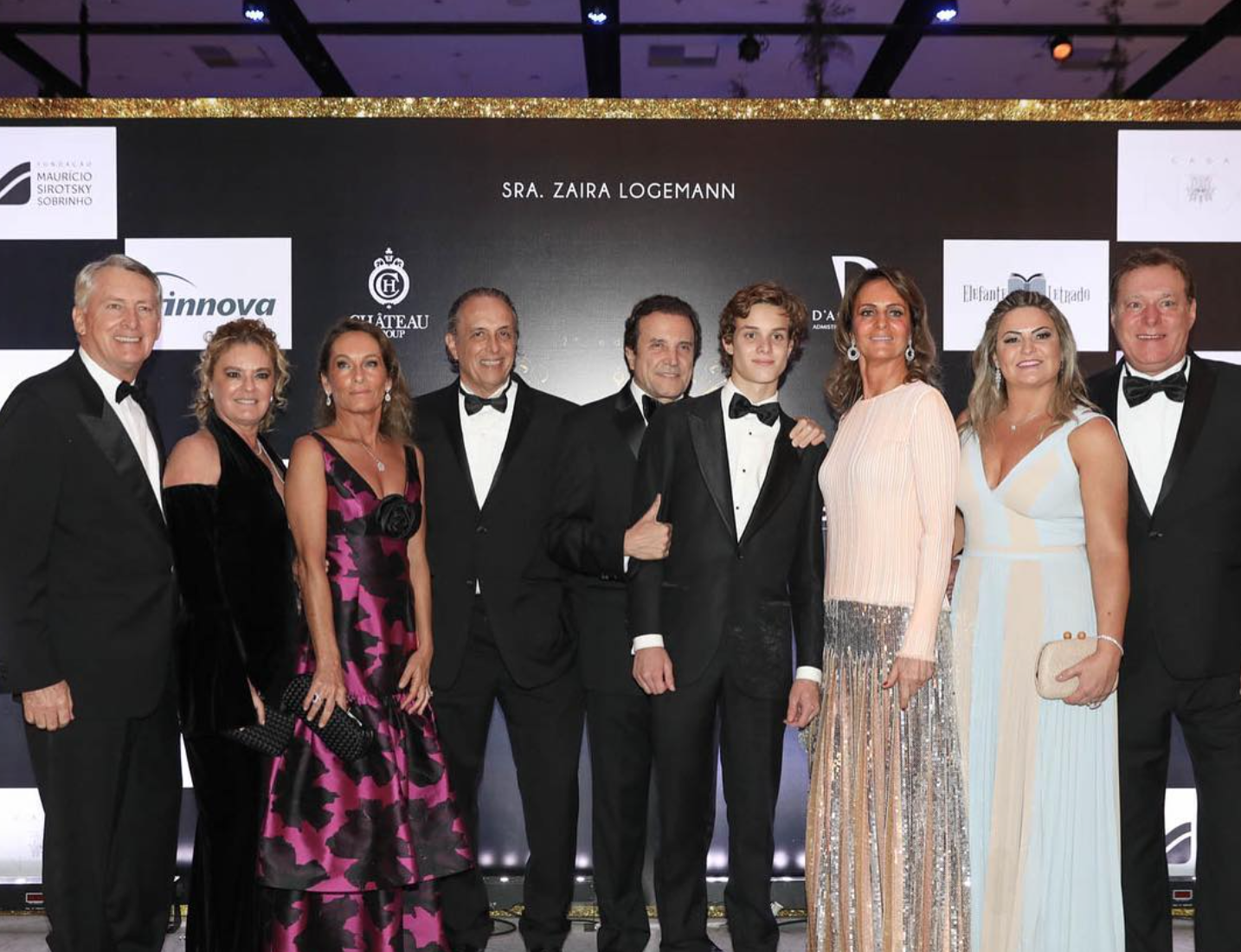
From left to right: Eduardo, Flavia Alvarez, Elizabeth, Segio Butori, Manoel Almeida. João Manoel, Ana, Luciane and Marcelo

The Logemann Family is a Brazilian family of northern German descent. They operate as a family enterprise, and have a full stake in Grupo SLC, a conglomerate of agro-industrial companies, one of them being SLC Agrícola, an agricultural company and land-holding corporation with properties totalling around 400,000 hectares (1,500 sq mi), which ranks the Logemann Family as the 53rd largest private landowner globally.

The family, after selling their John Deere stake in 1999, heavily invested in cotton, which placed them at the very top of global production.

All family members live in Porto Alegre, the capital of Brazil's southernmost state Rio Grande do Sul. According to Forbes in 2014, the family shares a 3 billion-dollar empire divided among 19 blood members.

The family has kept away from media attention, valuing discretion above all else.

== Business activities ==
The Logemann family began its business activities with Frederico Jorge Logemann, who founded Schneider & Logemann Cia LDTA. This company had a humble shop that repaired and manufactured agricultural tools for the village. Upon development, the company began producing their own threshers. Jorge Antonio Dahne Logemann then took control upon his father's death, and began development of automotive harvesting machines, being the first of the Southern Hemisphere to ever produce one. Mr. Jorge Logemann then founded SLC Agrícola in 1977 (now the family's main business) and in 1979, he merged SLC with John Deere for a Joint venture in Brazil. In 1987, Mr. Jorge Antonio Logemann passes away, and his two sons Eduardo and Jorge Luis took leadership of the family's businesses. In 1999, Eduardo and Jorge sold SLC & John Deere back to the John Deere group, and exited the business of tool and machine fabrication. In 2007, the family issues shares of SLC Agricola in B3 (stock exchange), which allowed SLC Agrícola to become one of the 10 most important companies of Rio Grande do Sul. In 2017, the family sold one of their businesses, Ferramentas Gerias, to Grupo OVD for an undisclosed amount.

== Notable members ==
Frederico Jorge Logemann, a German engineer from Bremen, founds the village of Belo Horizonte in 1927, today's Horizontina. In 1945, he and his partner Balduíno Schneider founded Schneider & Logemann Cia LTDA, focused on the fabrication and maintenance of agricultural tools. Two years after, the company constructed its first thresher. Mr. Logemann died in 1951, after which his only son, Jorge Antonio Dahne Logemann, continued his work.

Zaira Logemann, who died in 2017, had been the oldest member of the family since 1987, belonging to the second generation. She was married to Jorge Antonio Logemann, the member responsible for the creation of SLC and the joint venture with John Deere in 1977. Mrs. Zaira has also been at the forefront of a construction for a new hospital wing in Porto Alegre, which now take on her name.

Eduardo Logemann, eldest son of Zaira, is the current chairman of the family's companies. He is connected to seven boards, and served as vice president of Federação das Indústrias do Estado do Rio Grande do Sul.

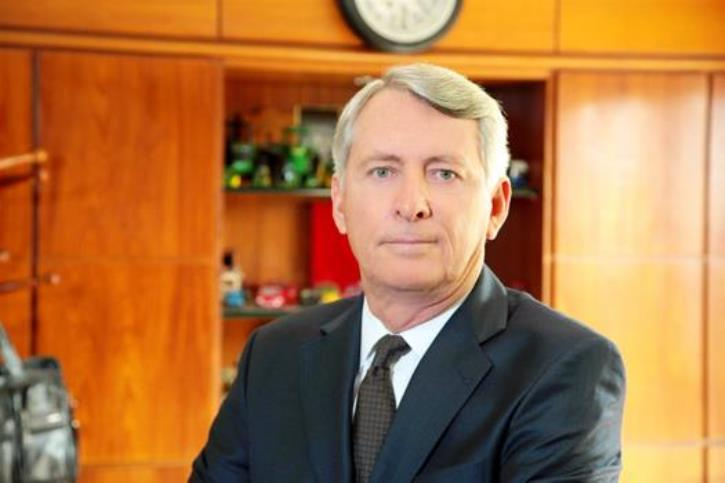
Eduardo Logemann in SLC Group HQ
