= Villa Bella Vista =

Historic house in Connecticut, United States

- U.S. National Register of Historic Places
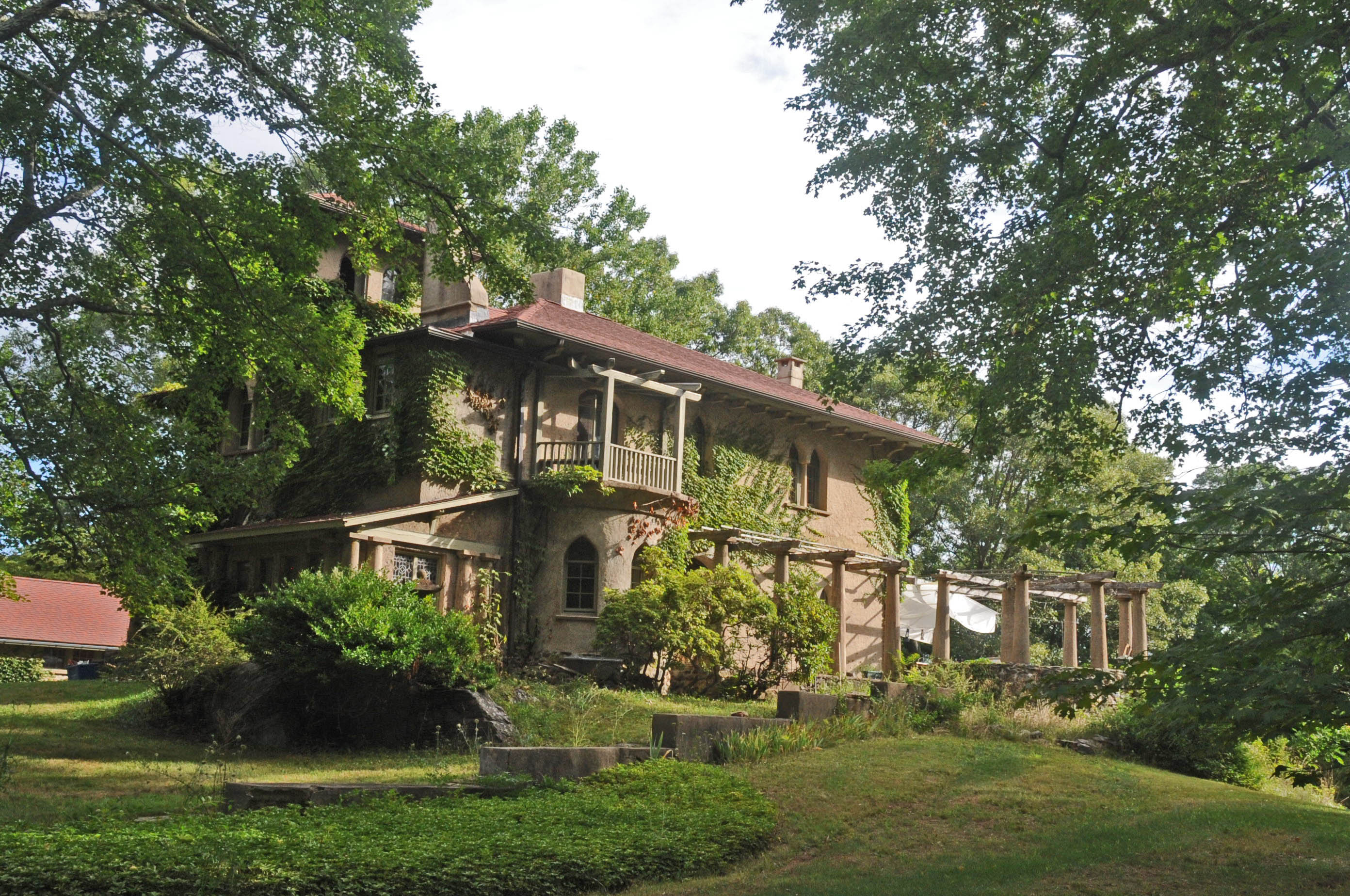
- In 2016

- Location within Connecticut Location within the United States
- Location: 7 Old Depot Road, Chester, Connecticut
- Coordinates: 41°24′12″N 72°26′28″W
- Area: 5 acres (2.0 ha)
- Built: 1908 and c. 1920
- Architect: Pierre, Eila; Lanzi, Martin
- Architectural style: Italianate
- NRHP reference No.: 00001560
- Added to NRHP: December 28, 2000

Villa Bella Vista, also known as the Eila Pierre House and The Ledges, is a historic house at 7 Old Depot Road in Chester, Connecticut. Built in 1908 by Italian masons, it is an architecturally distinctive structure, designed to resemble farmhouses of northern Italy. The house was listed on the National Register of Historic Places in 2000.

== Description and history ==
Villa Bella Vista is located east of the village center of Chester, on the north side of Old Depot Road just east of Connecticut Route 154. It is a large two-story structure, set on a hill overlooking the Connecticut River. It is built out of concrete faced in stuccoed stone, with a three-story tower at the northwest corner, which (like the main roof) has a shallow pitch with deep overhangs. The east side of the house has an open piazza sheltered by pergolas, with French doors providing access to the piazza from the house. There are several second-floor balconies, one of which is accessed by doors having Gothic pointed arches.

The villa was built in 1908, and was designed by the owner, Eila Pierre, who was inspired by the Italianate architecture of farmhouses in northern Italy. Although she was not a professional architect, she drew up the plans herself, adapting the form and materials to the settings of the hilltop site. The construction work was conducted by Italian immigrant masons who also did work on the nearby Gillette Castle. Pierre had what was considered locally to be a fairly scandalous life, as a divorcee (from the local Congregationalist minister) who had several gentleman companions.

== See also ==
- National Register of Historic Places listings in Middlesex County, Connecticut
