= Jonathan Warner House =

Historic house in Connecticut, United States

- U.S. National Register of Historic Places
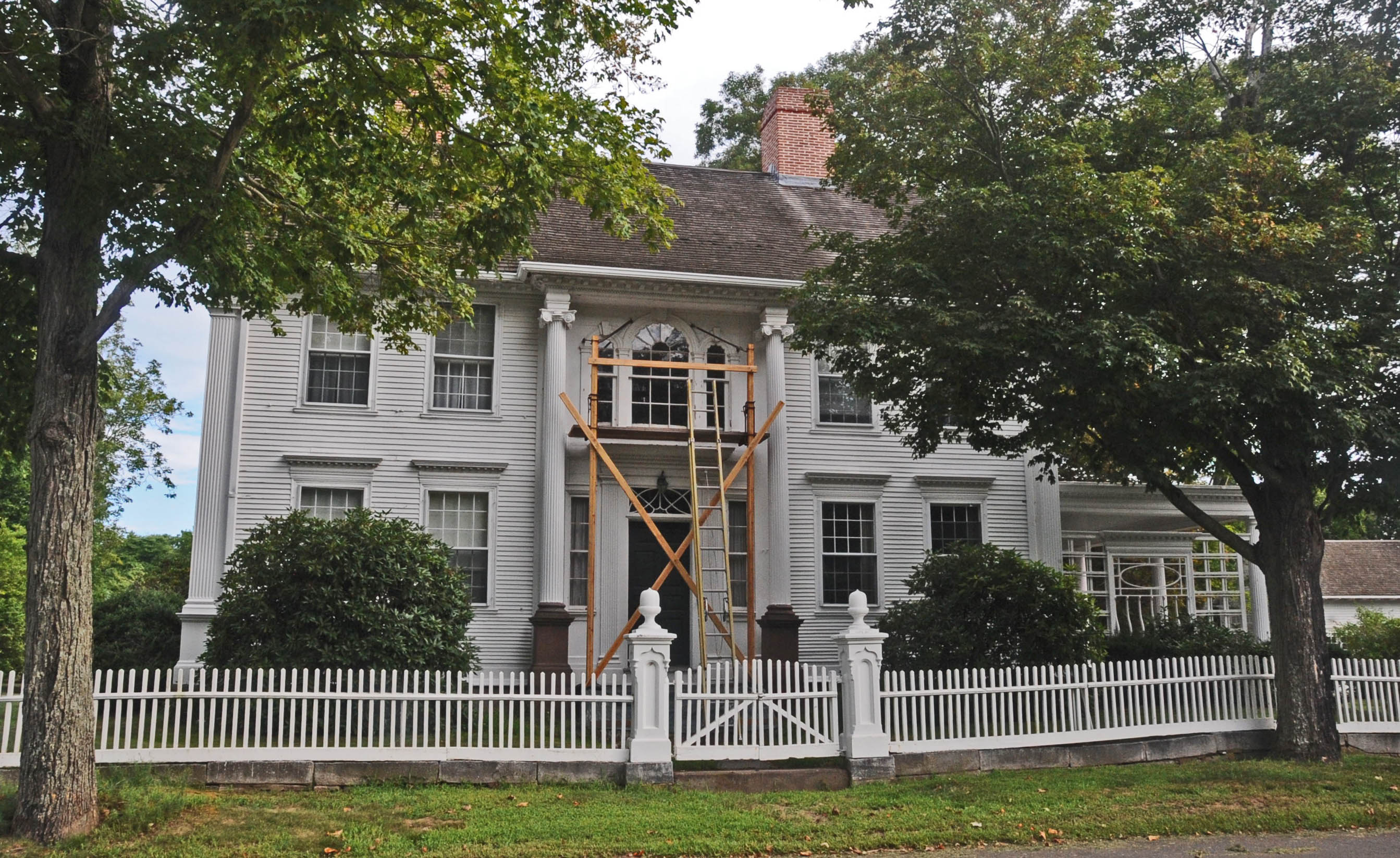
- in 2016

- Location within Connecticut Location within the United States
- Location: 47 Kings Highway, Chester, Connecticut
- Coordinates: 41°25′0″N 72°26′27″W
- Area: 28 acres (11 ha)
- Built: 1798 and 1924
- Architect: Warner, Jonathan
- Architectural style: Federal
- NRHP reference No.: 78002855
- Added to NRHP: December 19, 1978

The Jonathan Warner House, also known as Warner-Brooks House, is a historic house at 47 Kings Highway in Chester, Connecticut. Built in 1798, it is a well-preserved local example of Federal period architecture, featured prominently by architectural historian J. Frederick Kelly in The Early Domestic Architecture of Connecticut (1963). The house was listed on the National Register of Historic Places in 1978.

== Description and history ==
The Jonathan Warner House is located in a rural-suburban area of eastern Chester, at the northeast corner of East King's Highway and Middlesex Turnpike (Connecticut Route 154). It is a two-story wood-frame structure, five bays wide, with a side-gable roof, two interior chimneys, and clapboarded exterior. The central bay of the front is framed by two-story Ionic pillars supporting a small flat projecting roof. The main entrance is flanked by pilasters supporting an entablature, and sidelight windows outside the pilasters. It has a Palladian window above the entry with pilasters separating and flanking the window sections. A 19th-century carriage barn, which was moved to the site, serves as the garage. The interior of the house has many instance of fine woodwork, including several original fireplace mantels, and the main staircase.

The house was designed by Jonathan Warner, who supervised its construction in 1798 and who copiously documented the process. Surviving documentation includes receipts for purchase of most of the materials that originally went into its construction and finishing. Warner was a wealthy farmer, who also operated the nearby Chester–Hadlyme ferry and invested in merchant shipping ventures. The house was illustrated by J. Frederick Kelly in his prominent book The Early Domestic Architecture of Connecticut (1963). It is believed to resemble another mansion built earlier in New London.

== See also ==
- National Register of Historic Places listings in Middlesex County, Connecticut
