= Helen LaPlace =

American politician (1895–1988)

Member of the Connecticut House of Representatives from Deep River
- In office 1957–1959 Serving with John E. Larson
- Preceded by: Howard L. Knox; William A. Eagan
- Succeeded by: Jeanne F. Spallone; Ernest Nucci

Personal details
- Born: January 29, 1895 Peabody, Massachusetts, U.S.
- Died: November 1, 1988 (aged 93)
- Party: Republican
- Spouse: Simon R. LaPlace
- Children: 3
- Education: Sargent School of Physical Training; Hartford School of Nursing

Helen D. LaPlace (January 29, 1895 – November 1, 1988) was an American politician who served in the Connecticut House of Representatives from 1957 to 1959, representing the town of Deep River as a Republican.
