= Claire Sauer =

American politician

Member of the Connecticut House of Representatives from the 36th district
- In office 1995–2001
- Preceded by: Alan Kyle
- Succeeded by: James Spallone

Personal details
- Born: March 12, 1929 (age 97) Long Island, New York, U.S.
- Party: Democratic
- Spouse: Fred Sauer
- Children: 2
- Education: Cornell University

Claire Sauer (born March 12, 1929) is an American politician who served in the Connecticut House of Representatives from 1995 to 2001, representing the 36th district as a Democrat. She was born in Long Island, New York, and later moved to Lyme, Connecticut. Sauer is a graduate of Cornell University.
