= Renee LaMark Muir =

American politician

Member of the Connecticut House of Representatives from the 36th district
- Incumbent
- Assumed office January 8, 2025
- Preceded by: Christine Palm

Personal details
- Party: Democratic Party

Renee LaMark Muir is an American politician and member of the Connecticut House of Representatives since 2024 from the 36th district, which consists of the towns of Haddam, Chester, Essex, and Deep River. She attended John Jay College of Criminal Justice in New York City before working in law enforcement.
