= Charles Daniels House =

Historic house in Connecticut, United States

- U.S. National Register of Historic Places
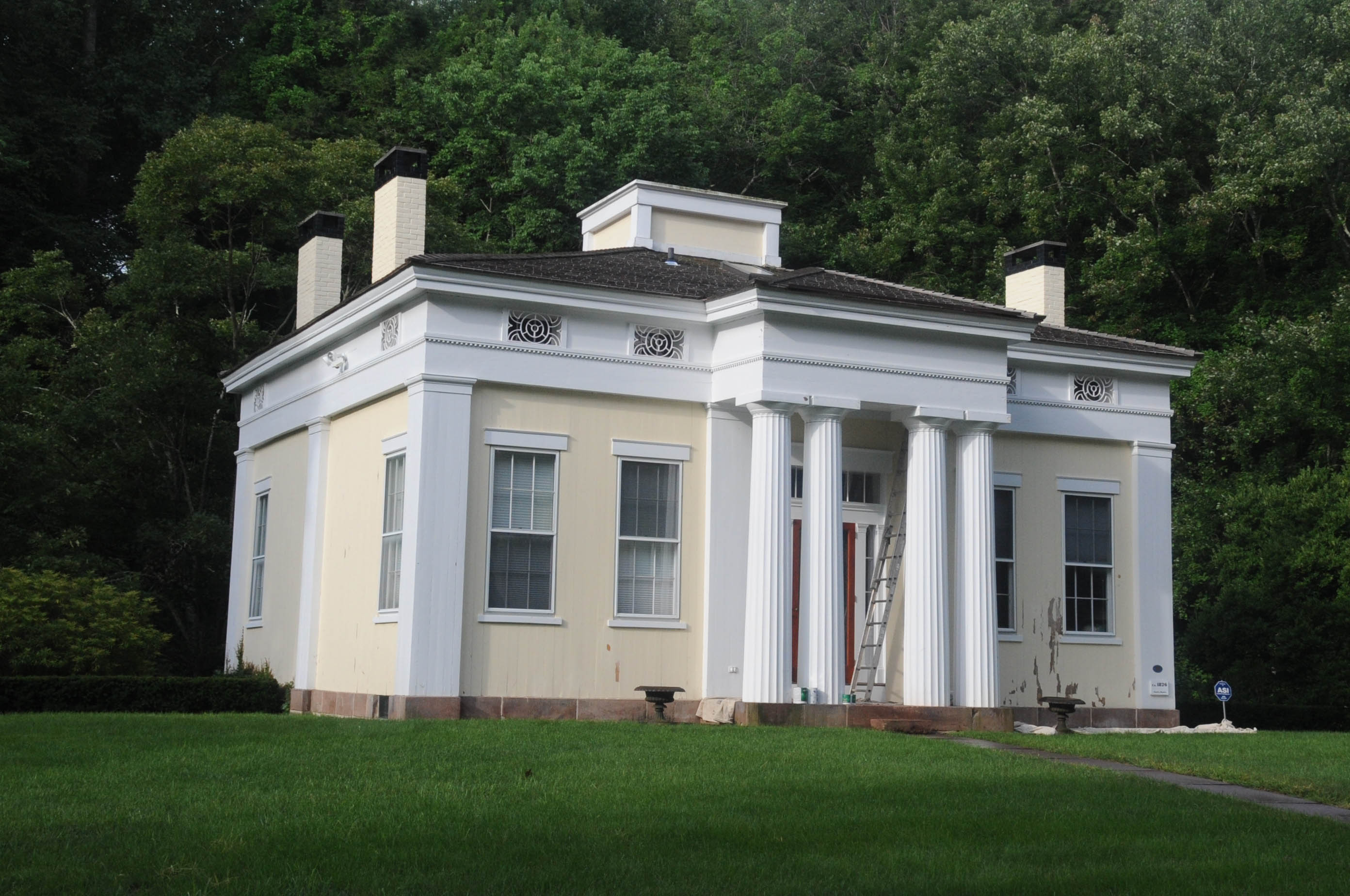
- in 2016

- Location within Connecticut Location within the United States
- Location: 43 Liberty Street, Chester, Connecticut
- Coordinates: 41°24′27″N 72°27′33″W
- Area: 1 acre (0.40 ha)
- Built: c. 1830 and 1978
- Architect: possibly Town & Davis
- Architectural style: Greek Revival
- NRHP reference No.: 88000094
- Added to NRHP: February 19, 1988

The Charles Daniels House is a historic house at 43 Liberty Street in Chester, Connecticut. Built about 1830 for a local factory owner and moved to its present site in 1978, it is a prominent example of high-style Greek Revival architecture with a temple front, possibly designed by the firm of Ithiel Town. The house was listed on the National Register of Historic Places in 1988.

== Description and history ==
The Charles Daniels House stands in a rural-residential setting about 0.5 miles (0.80 km) west of Chester's village green, on the south side of Liberty Street. It is a 1 1/2-story Greek Revival structure, five bays wide, with a hip-roofed portico supported by paired Doric columns. Having been relocated, it rests on a replacement foundation of concrete blocks, whose exterior has been finished with the ashlar granite veneer of the original foundation.

The interior is organized around a central stair hall, with a double parlor to the west and a dining room and library to the east. These principal rooms are embellished with fine woodwork, fluted pilasters, and decorative plaster mouldings.

The house, built (probably in the late 1820s) for Charles Daniels, owner of a nearby gimlet factory, is an excellent example of Greek Revival domestic architecture. Its design has traditionally been ascribed, without evidence, to the New Haven architecture firm of Town and Davis, one of whose principals was Ithiel Town. Nevertheless, the house is architecturally consistent with other works by Town.

The house was originally located about 300 feet (91 m) east of its present site, nearer the site of Daniels's factory, and was threatened with demolition after years of vacancy. The architect Thomas A. Norton moved it to its present site in 1978, and in reconstructing it, retained not only the original stone of the foundation veneer, but also the original brick of the chimney stacks.

== Gallery ==
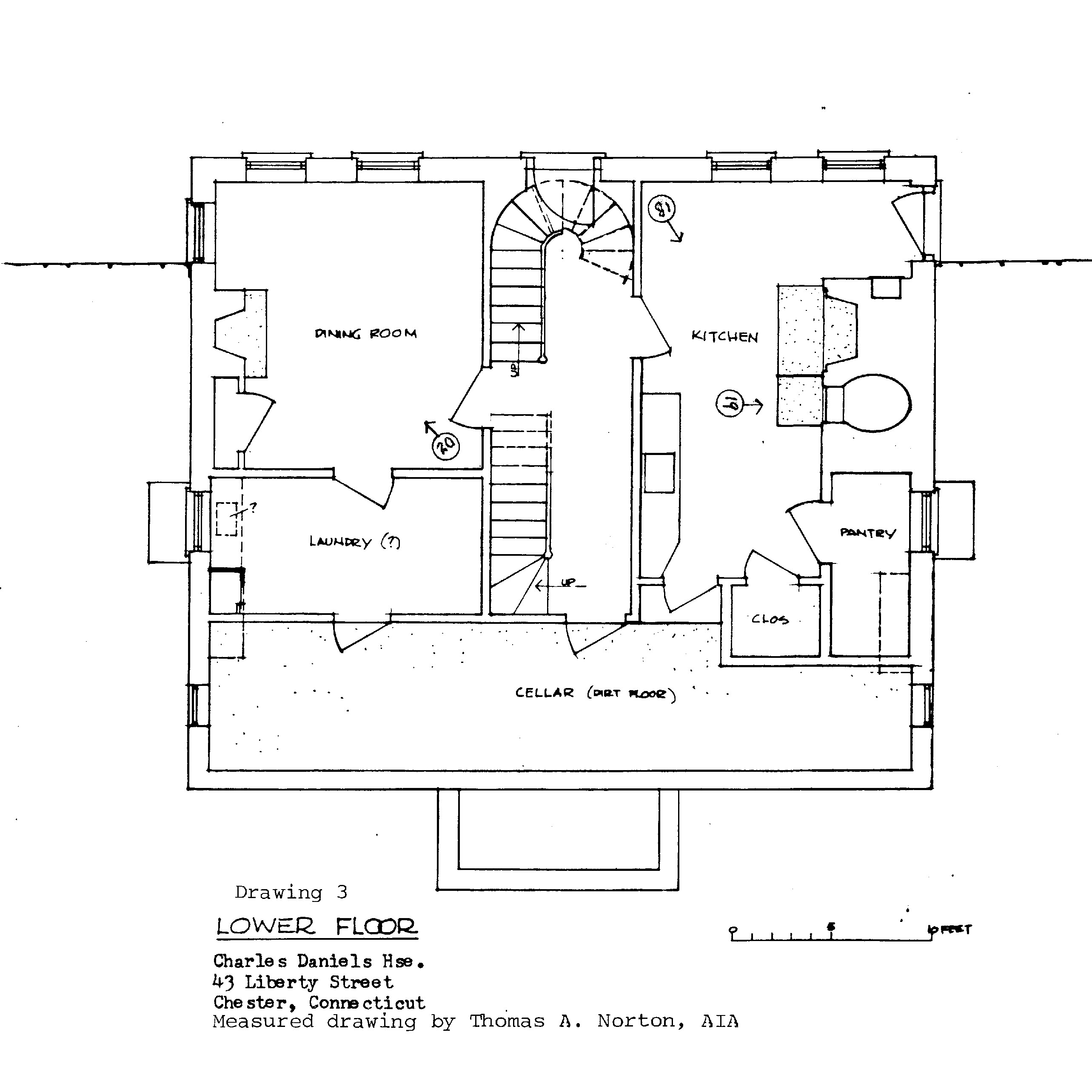
Basement Floor Plan of the Charles Daniels House.

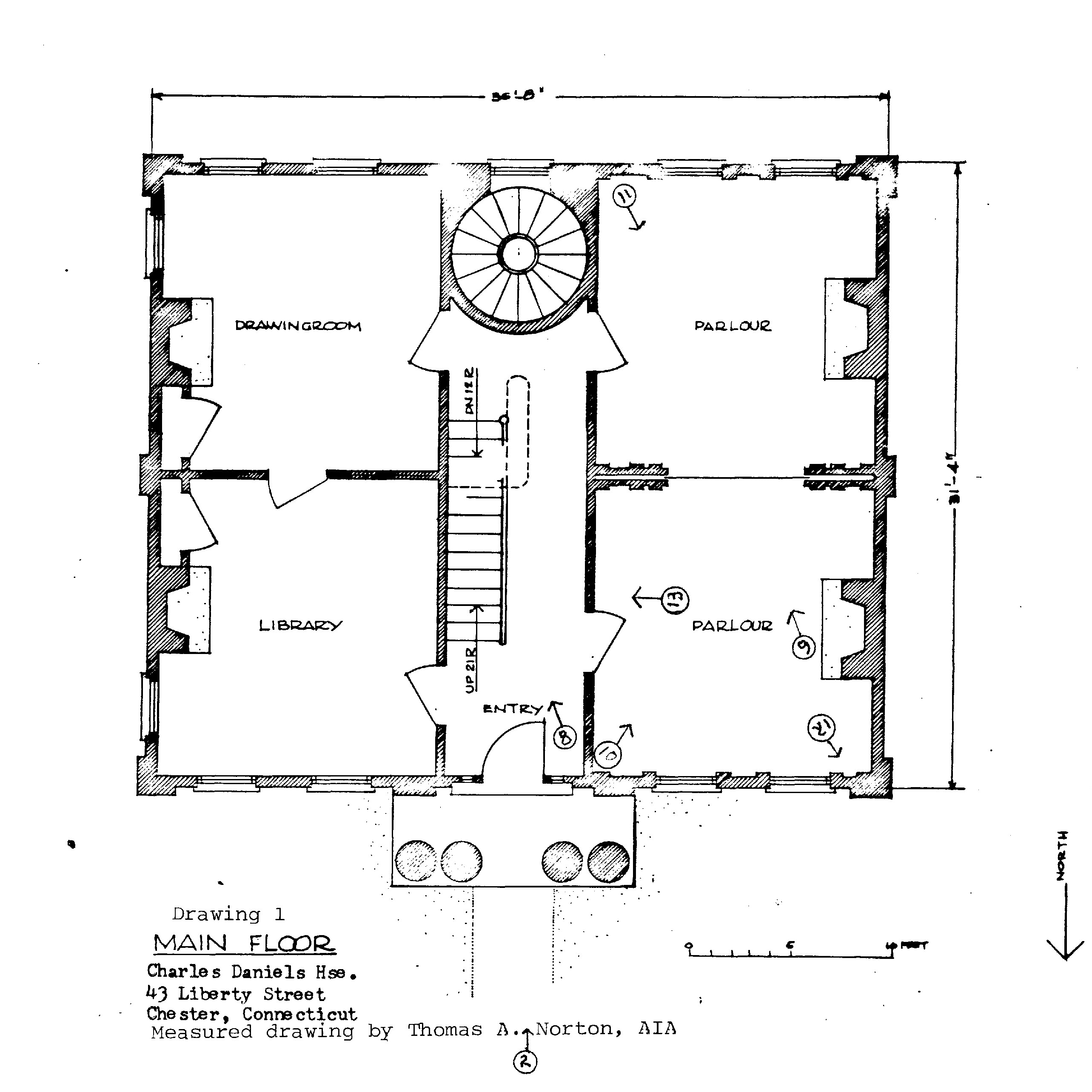
First Floor Plan of the Charles Daniels House.

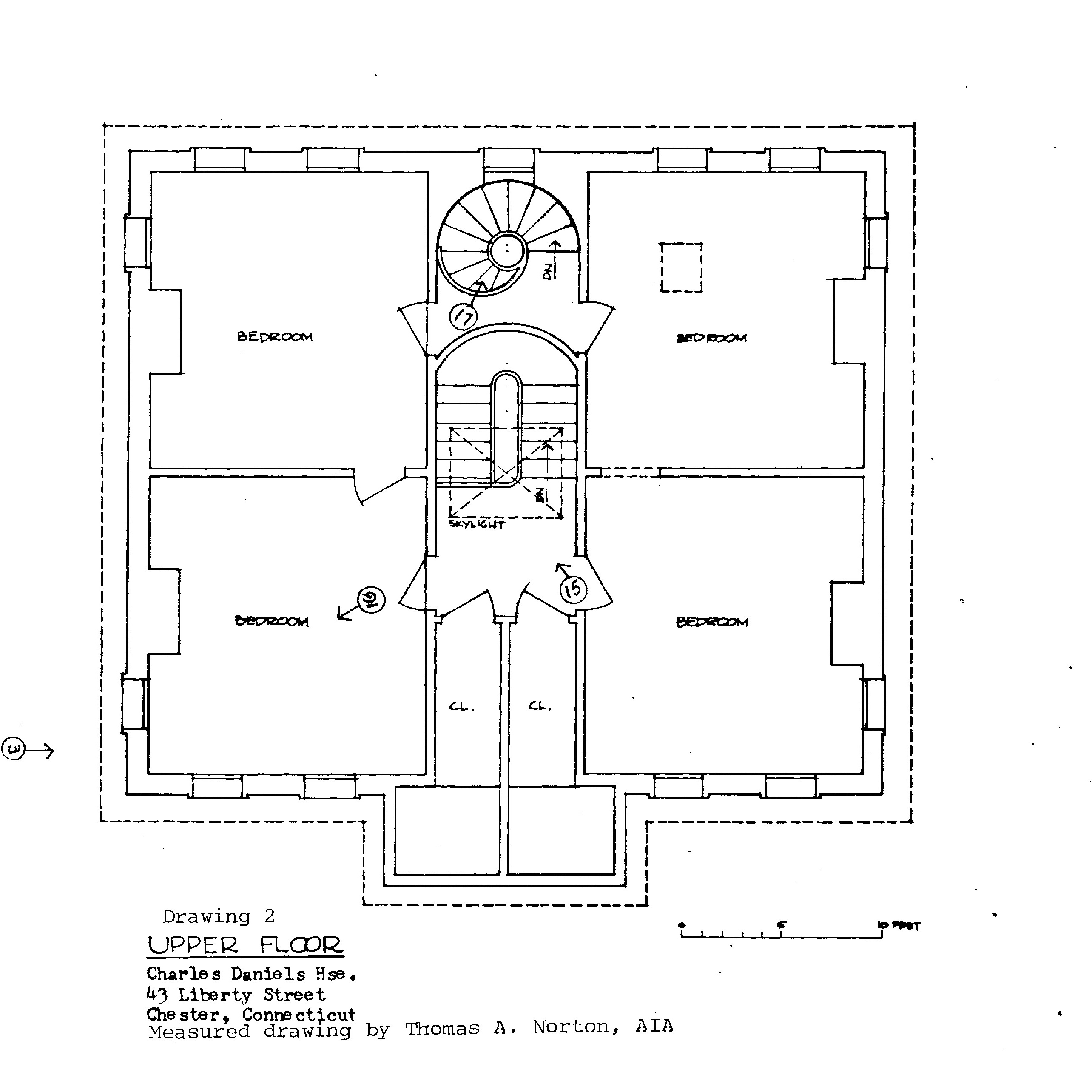
Second Floor Plan of the Charles Daniels House.

== See also ==
- National Register of Historic Places listings in Middlesex County, Connecticut
