= Chester Airport =

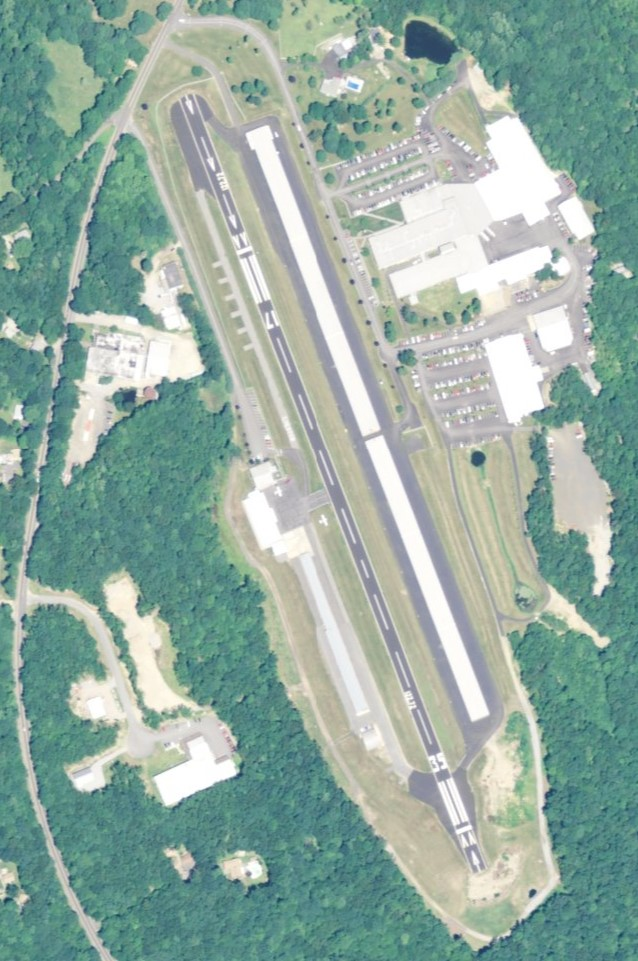
- USGS 2006 orthophoto
- IATA: none; ICAO: KSNC; FAA LID: SNC

Summary
- Airport type: Public
- Owner: Whelen Aviation
- Location: Chester, Connecticut
- Elevation AMSL: 416 ft (127 m)
- Coordinates: 41°23′02″N 072°30′21″W
- Website: www.chester-charter.com

Map
- Interactive map of Chester Airport

Runways
Direction	Length		Surface
Direction	ft	m	Surface
17/35	2,566	782	Asphalt

Statistics (2000)
- Aircraft operations: 20,800
- Based aircraft: 115
- Source: Federal Aviation Administration

Chester Airport (ICAO: KSNC, FAA LID: SNC) is a public use airport located three miles (5 km) southwest of the central business district of Chester, a town in Middlesex County, Connecticut, United States. It is privately owned by Whelen Aviation. It is included in the Federal Aviation Administration (FAA) National Plan of Integrated Airport Systems for 2017–2021, in which it is categorized as a general aviation facility.

Although most U.S. airports use the same three-letter location identifier for the FAA and IATA, Chester Airport is assigned SNC by the FAA but has no designation from the IATA (which assigned SNC to General Ulpiano Paez Airport in Salinas, Ecuador). The FAA identifier for Chester Airport was 3B9 and was changed to SNC in the early 2000s.

== Facilities and aircraft ==
Chester Airport covers an area of 146 acres (59 ha) which contains one asphalt paved runway (17/35) measuring 2,566 x 50 ft (782 x 15 m).

For the 12-month period ending August 21, 2000, the airport had 20,800 aircraft operations, an average of 56 per day: 80% general aviation and 20% air taxi. There are 115 aircraft based at this airport: 87% single engine, 9% multi-engine, 3% helicopters and 2% ultralights.
