= James Spallone =

American politician (born 1965)

James Field Spallone

Member of the Connecticut House of Representatives from the 36th district
- In office 2001–2011
- Preceded by: Claire Sauer
- Succeeded by: Philip J. Miller

Personal details
- Born: March 3, 1965 (age 61) New Haven, Connecticut, U.S.
- Party: Democratic
- Spouse: Alix Spallone
- Children: 2
- Relatives: Jeanne F. Spallone (mother)
- Education: Williams College; University of Connecticut Law School

James Field Spallone is an American politician and a member of the Democratic Party. First elected as state representative for Connecticut's 36th District in 2000, he won re-election in 2002, 2004, 2006 and 2008. Spallone was the House Co-Chair of the Government Administration and Elections committee, and also sat on the Environment and Judiciary committees. He was previously an assistant majority leader and vice-chairman of the Judiciary Committee. He was appointed co-chairman of the Municipal Ethics Task Force and the Commission on Enhancing Agency Outcomes.

On April 21, 2009, a Connecticut political blog reported that Spallone had filed paperwork to create an exploratory committee to run for the post of secretary of the state of Connecticut. He lost, but the winner, Denise Merrill, asked him to be the deputy secretary of the State. Later, he left to work as the lawyer to the Speaker of the House helping to pass many bills. He was then nominated to be a judge and later passed the Judicial Committee and now sits as a superior Court judge.

== Personal life and education ==
Spallone was born on March 3, 1965, in New Haven, Connecticut, to parents Daniel and Jeanne F. Spallone. He attended local public schools (Deep River Elementary, John Winthrop Junior High School and Valley Regional High School). He graduated from Valley Regional as valedictorian in 1983. He graduated from Williams College in Williamstown in 1987 and spent his junior year at Oxford University in England through the Williams-Exeter Programme at Oxford.

In 1989, he enrolled at the University of Connecticut School of Law. He was an associate editor of the Connecticut Journal of International Law and studied English law and European Community law for a semester at the University of Exeter during law school. He graduated from the University of Connecticut in 1992.

== Professional career ==
After graduating from law school, Spallone was a law clerk for the Honorable William J. Lavery of the Connecticut Appellate Court for the 1992-1993 term. He has practiced law before state and federal courts for over 15 years and has his own practice in Essex, focusing on civil and criminal litigation. He was an associate at the firms of Gould, Larson, Bennet, Wells & McDonnell in Essex and Waller, Smith, and Palmer in New London, and is now in private practice.

Spallone was a field organizer for the Dukakis for President campaign in 1987-1988 and a staff assistant for the Democratic National Committee from 1988 to 1989.

== Legislative accomplishments ==
In 2008, Spallone was one of five Democratic members of the Connecticut House of Representatives who voted against the state budget. His rationale included lost opportunities to reform the property tax and municipal financing systems. During the same session, he proposed a bill that now allows cities, towns and local school districts to participate in reverse auctions. He also co-sponsored two environmental bills, one (Public Act 09-98) which capped greenhouse gas emissions at 10% below 1990 levels by 2020 and 80% below 2001 levels by 2050, and the other (Public Act 08-174) which preserved small community farms by creating a segregated funding account in the state budget.

In 2007, Spallone led the fight to amend elections law to allow 17-year-olds to vote in a primary assuming they would attain the age of 18 by the general election. The bill, House Joint Resolution 11, overwhelmingly passed both chambers and, as it required a change to the state constitution, was before the general electorate in the 2008 election. Voters approved the change by a large margin. He also focused on legislation that would require legislators to disclose outside income and an initiative that moved the presidential primary from March 4 to February 5 in order to encourage more candidates to visit Connecticut.

Other legislative initiatives that Spallone has focused on include a requirement that an environmental review be performed before the sale of state property; crafting a stable revenue stream for open space, shoreline access and affordable housing; a news reporter "shield" law, which would prevent new reporters from being compelled to reveal confidential news sources or information; campaign finance reform; increased access to health care; and preserving the integrity of the election process.

In 2009, Spallone was a leader in ensuring the passage of a bill (SB913) that would require a special election in the case of a vacancy in the office of United States Senator. Connecticut law presently allows for gubernatorial appointment. Spallone claimed that such a process was ripe for corruption and violated the right to vote. Spallone was also at the forefront of a movement to enact an election day registration provision. The bill, House Bill 6435, passed the House of Representatives but died in the Senate due to inaction.

For the past several legislative sessions, Spallone has been a lead proponent of legislation that would permit Connecticut to join a national compact to elect the President of the United States by national popular vote, rather than through the electoral college. Presently, five states have joined the compact. Recent public polling shows that 74% of Connecticut residents would prefer that the president be elected by popular vote.

== Membership and group affiliations ==
- Member, Southeastern Connecticut Committee on Foreign Relations (2003–present)
- Director, Valley Shore YMCA (2003–present)
- Member, American Bar Association (1996–2008)
- Member, Connecticut Bar Association (1993–present)
- Member, Rhode Island Bar Association (1998–present)
- Member, Middlesex County Bar Association (1996–present)
- Member, New London County Bar Association (1996–present)
- Director, Block Island Club (1989–present)
- President, Block Island Club (1996–2002)
- Member, Essex Democratic Town Committee (2000(?)-present)

== Sources ==
- Legislative web page
- National Popular Vote
