= Camp Hazen YMCA =

Youth camp in Chester, Connecticut, US

- Formation: 1920
- Type: Summer Camp
- Headquarters: Chester, Connecticut, USA
- Coordinates: 41°23′58″N 72°29′44.35″W
- Executive Director: Denise Learned
- Camp Director: Kath Davies
- Affiliations: YMCA; American Camp Association
- Website: www.camphazenymca.org

Located on 150 acres on Cedar Lake in Chester, Connecticut, Camp Hazen YMCA provides youth camping for over 1500 boys and girls each year from throughout the state. Group camping includes over 6000 participants annually. Camp Hazen YMCA serves youth from throughout Connecticut, New England and many states around the country. Each summer, Camp Hazen YMCA is also home to campers and counselors from more than 25 different countries. Campers come from all socio-economic backgrounds, and range in age from 5 to 18. Over 800 campers were provided with financial assistance in 2009. These funds, over $205,000, were provided by individuals, foundations, businesses and service clubs.

Camp Hazen YMCA has a 27-member Board of Directors. In addition, there are seven standing committees including: Executive Committee; Marketing and Communications; Board Development; Resource Development; Program; Building and Facilities; and Alumni Development. Camp Hazen YMCA was recently listed as one of the best value camps in the northeast by the Boston Globe.

== History ==
In May 1919, The State YMCA voted that "Steps should be taken at once to secure a suitable site and equipment for the character development of the boys in Connecticut in connection with the advantages and favorable aspects of camp life"

Having grown up in the next town Senator Edward W. Hazen knew of a property, then known as the Stodt Farm, which would be a perfect place for a camp. In March 1920, he purchased the original 29 acres on Cedar Pond. The State YMCA honored him by naming the camp, Camp Hazen and in the summer of 1920, the first camping sessions were held. Pop Stanley was the first Camp Director. A building on the site, Stanley Lodge, was named after him. The first summer was a success with boys from 10 to 20 years of age from around the state attending. The boys built their own tents, did calisthenics drills in pajamas, swam, attended chapel, played sports, had tents inspection and siesta.

In 1940, 'Pop' Stanley retired after 20 years of service as the Camp Director and because of the uncertain times associated with the War and rebuilding, they didn't have another long-term Director until Archie Knowles in 1948. During World War II finding counselors was a tough assignment because so many of them had been drafted to fight. For some campers, it was not unusual to wake up and find their counselor packing their belongings and heading off to 'boot camp'. Quite often the only replacements for the staff were the older campers and sometimes this was thirteen-year-old boys. After the war ended in 1945, camp flourished under Archie Knowles' leadership. The introduction of a leadership program, which was based in Oskalee Village, as well as a permanent teen trip program were some of the most significant program changes of this era. In the seven years that Archie was the Camp Director he managed to restore many of the facilities, expand the program and stabilize their finances. He is honored today by Knowles Lodge.

Howard Bunting was appointed director in 1955 and, along with his wife, began the longest era of directorship in Camp Hazen history. Mr. and Mrs. 'B' were camp administrators for 22 years and were witness to major events such as the naming of Junianta, Mosakwa, Sachem and Tamarack Villages, the first night of the summer of 1967 when the Dining Hall burned to the ground, the replacement of the old cabins to the ones seen today and the Independence of Camp Hazen YMCA from the State YMCA of Connecticut

When Mr. 'B' retired in 1977 he was honored by having the Bunting Dining Hall named after him. His successor, Russ Gormley was instrumental in developing the horseback program, the ropes course program, the naming of Tamarack Village and the biggest change in Camp Hazen YMCA history, going co-ed. The first female Executive Director, Sue Edmonds, was appointed in 1988 followed by Tim Millbern in 1995 who started the popular day camp program. Since 1999, Denise Learned has led Camp Hazen YMCA with the same focus as all of her predecessors, to 'help youth develop valuable life skills through camping experiences that build healthy bodies, open minds, and awakened spirits.' During this time the co-ed Village Onandaga was formed, allowing 10th grade campers to keep coming back to camp. All of the cabins have been updated and a Post & Beam Maintenance Barn was added.

== Resident Camp ==
Hazen offers a traditional overnight camp for kids who entering grades 3 through 10. The resident campers are split into five villages by both gender and age. A typical day of camp includes breakfast, cabin cleanup, activity periods one, two, and three, lunch, siesta, activity periods four and five, free time called Beach Party, dinner, an evening activity and cabin chat. At the beginning of each session, the campers get to preference their activities the allowing each child to tailor their experience to their liking. Activities include but are not limited to Rock Climbing, Ropes Course, Hiking, Drama, Radio, Archery, Tennis, Basketball, Soccer, Softball, General Water Sports, Instructional Swimming, Recreational Swimming, Arts and Crafts, Mountain Biking The staff to camper ratio is 1:4. Overnight camp is offered in one or two week sessions.

== Day Camp ==
Campers participate in: Creative Arts - crazy critters, clay models, dream catchers, face painting, nature art and more Land Sports - Basketball, kickball, volleyball, archery, capture the flag & parachute games Outdoor Pursuits - fishing, outdoor cooking, shelter building, climbing the wall Water Sports - Swimming lessons, canoeing (for all), kayaking (for older campers)
