= Terra Santa Agro =

Terra Santa Agro S.A.
- Type: Sociedade Anônima
- Traded as: B3: TESA3
- Industry: Agribusiness
- Founded: 2003
- Headquarters: Nova Mutum, Brazil
- Key people: de Araújo, Silvio Tini (Chairman of the Board); José Humberto Teodoro, (CEO)
- Products: Cotton, soybeans, corn
- Revenue: ▲US$395.0 million (2012)
- Net income: ▼US$ 62.5 million (2012)
- Number of employees: 1,764
- Website: www.terrasantaagro.com

Terra Santa Agro is a publicly traded Brazilian agribusiness company. As an agricultural commodities producer focused on the production of soybean, corn, and cotton, and on land appreciation, it operates 7 production units strategically located in the Brazilian state of Mato Grosso, and manages a total area of approximately 156.6 thousand hectares.

The Company also holds equipment and other assets that complement its agricultural operations. These include:

- 512 agricultural equipment items, 437 owned
- 9 warehouses, 5 owned
- 3 owned cotton gins

The Company’s shares are listed on the BM&FBovespa’s Novo Mercado segment, the highest corporate governance level of Brazilian stock markets.

On December 20, 2018, the company announced the restructuring of its bank debt with Itau Unibanco SA – Nassau branch. The renegotiation of $85 million aims to align the financial and operating cash flows of the company.

== History ==
Founded in 2003 in Rio de Janeiro as Brasil Ecodiesel, a biodiesel producer. In 2011, after the merger with Maeda Agroindustrial and Vanguarda Participações, the company changed its name to Vanguarda Agro (2016) and moved its headquarters to Nova Mutum in Mato Grosso.
