= Christine Palm =

American politician from Connecticut

Member of the Connecticut House of Representatives from the 36th district
- In office January 9, 2019 – January 8, 2025
- Preceded by: Robert Siegrist
- Succeeded by: Renee LaMark Muir

Personal details
- Born: January 12, 1956 (age 70)
- Party: Democratic
- Education: Goddard College (BA)

Christine A. Palm (born January 12, 1956) is an American politician who served in the Connecticut House of Representatives representing the 36th district in Middlesex County.

== Political career ==
=== Election ===
Palm was elected in the general election on November 6, 2018, winning 50.82% of the vote over 49.18% of Republican candidate Robert Siegrist.

Connecticut's 36th State House congressional district results, 2018
| Party | Candidate | Votes | % |
|---|---|---|---|
| Democratic | Christine Palm | 6,572 | 50.82% |
| Republican | Robert Siegrist (incumbent) | 6,360 | 49.18% |
| Total votes | | 12,932 | 100% |
| Democratic gain from Republican | | | |
