= Horizontina =

Municipality in Rio Grande do Sul, Brazil

- Municipality
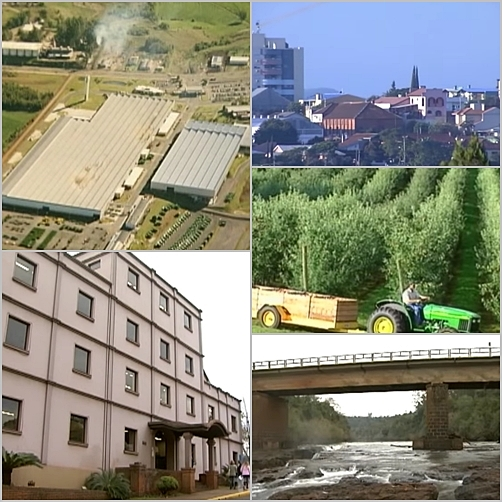
- Images of Horizontina

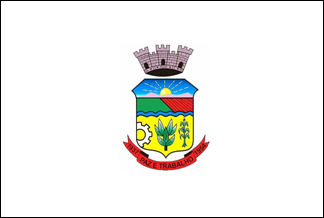
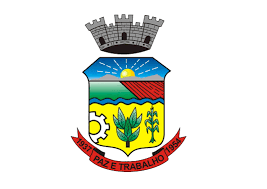
- Flag Coat of arms

- Location of Horizontina in Rio Grande do Sul

- Location in Brazil
- Coordinates: 27°37′33″S 54°18′28″W
- Country: Brazil
- Region: South
- State: Rio Grande do Sul
- Founded: 28 February 1955

Government
  - Mayor: Jones Jehn da Cunha
  - Vice-Mayor: Zuleika Wener Savik

Area
  - Total: 232.476 km^{2} (89.759 sq mi)
- Elevation: 343 m (1,125 ft)

Population (2020)
  - Total: 19,389
  - Density: 83.402/km^{2} (216.01/sq mi)
- Time zone: UTC−3 (BRT)
- Website: http://www.horizontina.rs.gov.br/

Horizontina (Portuguese pronunciation: [oɾizõˈtʃĩnɐ]) is a municipality in Rio Grande do Sul, in southern Brazil, with 19,389 inhabitants in 2020. It is located 496 km north of the state capital. The first settlers were German, Italian and Polish immigrants who arrived in the region in 1927. Nowadays, most of the inhabitants are of German-Brazilian descent.

The city has an average annual temperature of 20.8 °C. Horizontina's human development index is 0.783, considered high by the United Nations Development Programme, ranking 110th in Brazil, 11th in the state of Rio Grande do Sul, and 1st in its micro-region.

The colonization of the city occurred in 1927, when the first German colonists arrived in the region. A year later came more families from other ethnic groups, causing the place to develop. The first name of the city council was Belo Horizonte, later becoming Vila Horizonte and Horizonte before settling on the current name, Horizontina, in 1944. Before being elevated to a municipality, it was a district in the municipality of Santa Rosa. Only in December 1954 was the district emancipated.

The city is known as the "Cradle of National Automotive Harvesters," due to the construction of the first Brazilian automotive harvester in the city in 1965. A unit of US company John Deere is installed in Horizontina, generating about 80% of the city's tax revenue.

Supermodel Gisele Bündchen was born and raised in Horizontina. Her grandfather, Walter Bündchen (died 2010) also once served as the municipality's mayor.

== Regional language ==
The German dialect Riograndenser Hunsrückisch is the most-spoken German dialect in Brazil and as such an integral part of the history of many municipalities throughout the state of Rio Grande do Sul, including Horizontina. In 2012 the Legislative Assembly voted unanimously in favor of official recognition of Riograndenser Hunsrückisch as a piece of cultural heritage to be preserved and protected.

== See also ==
- List of municipalities in Rio Grande do Sul
