= Jane Logemann =

American painter

- Born: Jane Logemann; 1942 (age 83–84); Milwaukee, Wisconsin, United States
- Education: Layton School of Art, Milwaukee], B.A., University of Wisconsin–Milwaukee, 1961
- Known for: Painting, drawing
- Movement: Abstract art
- Website: http://www.janelogemann.com/index.html

Jane Logemann is an American artist based in New York City, specializing in abstract aesthetic featuring symmetry in nature and calligraphy-Hebraic art. She is a member of the American Abstract Artists (AAA) and her art is exhibited in a variety of public galleries including the Museum of Modern Art, the Walker Art Center, and the Contemporary Jewish Museum.

Logemann studied at the Layton School of Art in Milwaukee, WI, and has a Bachelor of Science in Fine Arts from the University of Wisconsin–Milwaukee.

Several museums feature works by Logemann as part of their collections, including The Morgan Library & Museum, the Providence Athenaeum, the Whitney Museum of American Art, the British Museum, and the university collections of Harvard and Yale.
