= Gothic sculpture =

Sculpture style in Europe during the Middle Ages

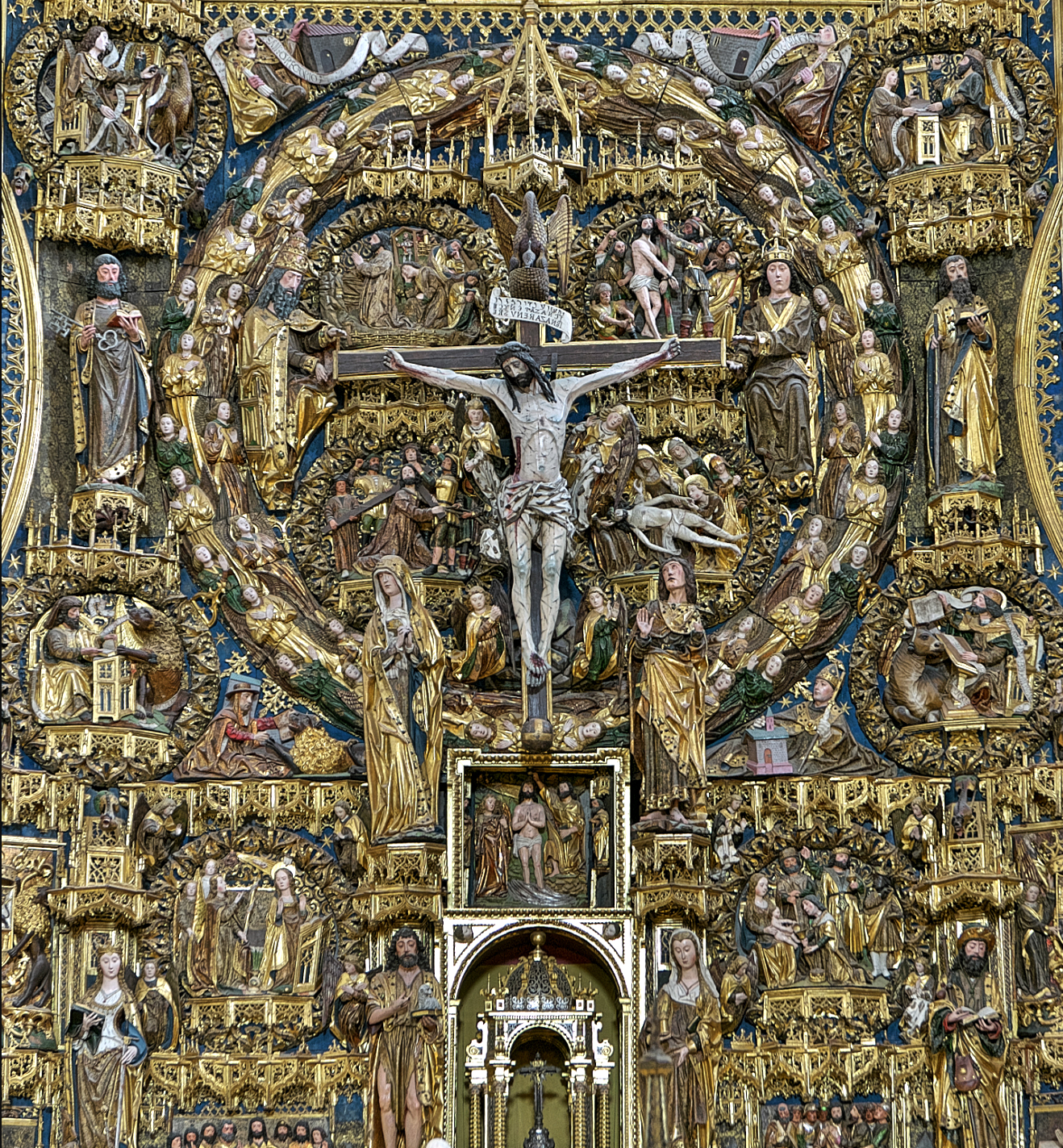
Detail of the main altar of the Miraflores Charterhouse, Spain. Gil de Siloé. Polychrome wood, 1496–1499.

Gothic sculpture was a sculpture style that flourished in Europe during the Middle Ages, from about mid-12th century to the 16th century, (Note: The chronology of the period varies significantly according to the source consulted) evolving from Romanesque sculpture and dissolving into Renaissance sculpture and Mannerism.

When the classical values started to be appreciated again in the Renaissance, the sculpture from the previous centuries was seen as shapeless and rough and was given the name of Gothic, since it was believed to come from the culture of the Goths, people considered barbaric and supposedly responsible for the disappearance of the Roman Empire.

But the people from the Gothic period never gave themselves that name neither they considered themselves barbarians. On the contrary, in its emergence Gothic art was seen as innovative and was called opus modernum ("modern work"), being sculpture one of its most important and sophisticated expressions. However, the negative appreciation lasted until mid-19th century when a revivalist movement appeared, called neo-Gothic, that recovered its values. In actuality, it is known that Gothic art has nothing to do with the Goths—but the denomination remained, consecrated by the use.

Gothic sculpture was born closely linked to architecture—as a result of the decoration of the great cathedrals and other religious buildings—but it eventually gained independence and started to be worked as autonomous art. It started in Paris, France, and had its first important expression in the reform of the Basilica of Saint-Denis between 1137 and 1144. Its first phase developed an austere, sleek style, with elongated proportions and a general hieratical aspect, wishing to convey an impression of spirituality, quite far from the actual anatomy of a body.

From the 13th century, the style began to evolve toward greater naturalism and realism, with the progressive absorption of classical influences and a greater observation of nature. Changes in religious doctrine, which led to a rapprochement of God toward man and a softening in his previously inaccessible and inflexible character, also contributed to influencing the evolution of preferred forms and themes. By the 14th century, the Gothic style had spread far beyond the borders of France, important regional schools were formed, and by the 15th century it dominated most of Europe, then began a decline that followed different patterns in different regions. Gothic sculpture in its late stages continued to be widely used in architectural decoration, but by this time, the sculptors had already experimented with the most diverse materials and explored the most varied uses for reliefs and statues, forming a collection of extraordinary richness and variety.

The history of Gothic sculpture still has many uncertainties and grey areas, and its study is far from complete. At various times in history, there was mass destruction of medieval monuments and works of art (for example, in the iconoclastic issue throughout the Reformation and during the French Revolution) and so the determination of the chronology, genealogy and geographical distribution of the style presents many gaps impossible to be filled. Added to this is the fact that when the Gothic style was finally reappraised in the second half of the 19th century, many inadequate restorations were made to the surviving monuments for lack of deeper knowledge. Even in the face of so many difficulties, the legacy of Gothic sculpture is still vast and lives on in buildings, collections, museums, widely circulated textbooks and other forms.

== Overview and chronology ==
=== Theoretical background ===
The Gothic style was largely the result of the definition of a new visual vocabulary for the representation of images, accompanying the debate that was taking place about certain concepts of the Christian religion. One of the most important points in this debate was about the validity of the representation of sacred images, a problem that went back to the very origin of Christianity and was not yet sufficiently clarified. Early Christianity harbored an aversion to the depiction of sacred images, a reservation that had been inherited from Judaism, which forbade the creation of images for worship, fearing idolatry. An explicit command against depiction of sacred images was issued in the Ten Commandments, where the third one states:

"Thou shalt not make unto thee any graven image."

On the other hand, the ancient classical pagan tradition, which provided essential elements for the formulation of the new faith, was fully in favor of the representation of gods, and both currents remained in constant friction throughout the Middle Ages.

One of the first consistent Christian statements favoring the depiction of sacred images came from Pope Gregory I, who in letters to the Bishop of Marseille written around year 600 laid the groundwork for the controversy that followed. In them, the pope said that images, like other material things, should not be worshiped, but neither should they be destroyed because the representation of scenes from sacred history and of biblical characters were useful for the teaching of doctrine to the illiterate masses, who "could read in them what they could not read in books", and their contemplation could lead the devout to the contemplation of God.

Gregory I had recurred for this to the opinion of Basil the Great, who had stated centuries earlier that "the honor given to the image ascends to its prototype." The Gregorian statement, coming from a pope considered wise—later elevated to the rank of Doctor of the Church, like Basil—together with the contribution of John of Damascus, were powerful arguments in the iconoclastic question that agitated Christians from the beginning and raged strongly in the Byzantine Empire.

Although the issue was officially settled in year 787 at the Second Council of Nicaea, which legalized the veneration of images, the debate continued, and over the following centuries, various other prelates wrote texts defending sacred art, and both the texts from the early church and from ancient philosophers continued to be cited as authorities.

Specially linked to the rise of the Gothic were the texts of Pseudo-Dionysius the Areopagite, an author who had drunk from the Platonic fountain through Plotinus and who was held in high esteem in France from the 9th-10th centuries onward, being an influence on Suger, the creator of the first Gothic church to be erected. By this time, the iconoclastic problem had finally been overcome by a number of other theoretical contributions, and sacred art had been definitively consolidated, even if protests were still heard here and there, and had become not only biblia pauperum ("books for the uneducated"), but were also offered as authorized versions, supervised by the constituted ecclesiastical hierarchy, for the rectification of oral traditions that misrepresented or unduly embellished sacred history.

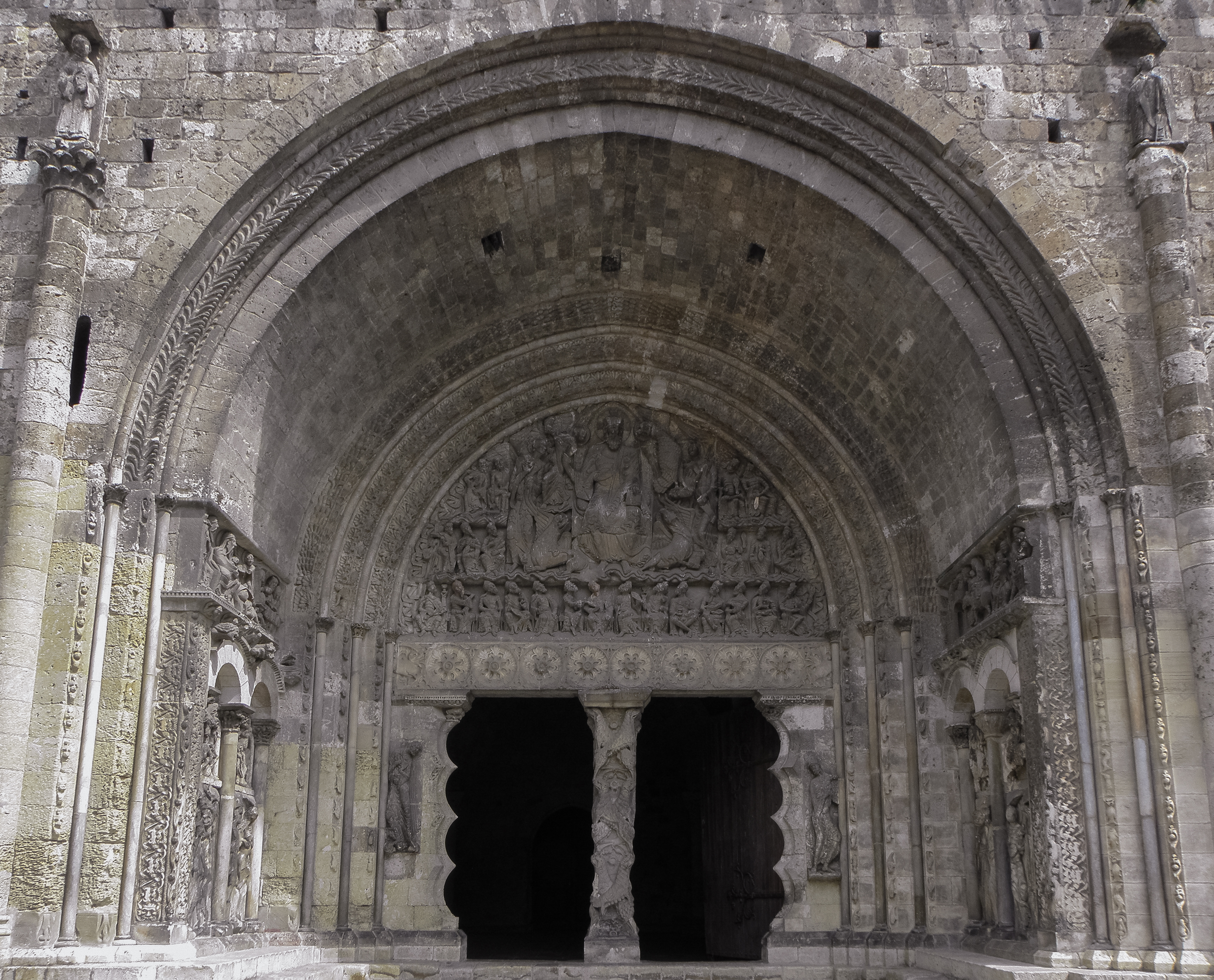
Romanesque example: Portal of Moissac Abbey, 11th century

=== Early Gothic ===
The proof of this success is in the great proliferation of sacred representations that took place during the final phase of the Romanesque, between the 11th and 12th centuries, establishing a body of thematic motifs and forms suitable for conveying religious doctrine.

Regarding sculpture, the main Romanesque iconography was left in the decoration of the tympana over the main entrances of churches and cathedrals, conceived as a visual introduction and a spiritual preparation for the worship that was to take place inside, which coincides with the appearance of the first Gothic examples in the 12th century.

In fact, the Romanesque iconographic programs naturally exerted great influence on the Gothic, the latter being a natural evolution from the former. Thus, the stylistic distinction between Romanesque and Early Gothic sculpture often becomes subtle. The most obvious innovations of Early Gothic were the application of sculptures to the archivolts and lateral columns of the portals and a growing tendency toward a less compact, more open and rational organization of scenes, and a lengthening in the proportions of figures, accompanying the greater verticalism of the buildings.

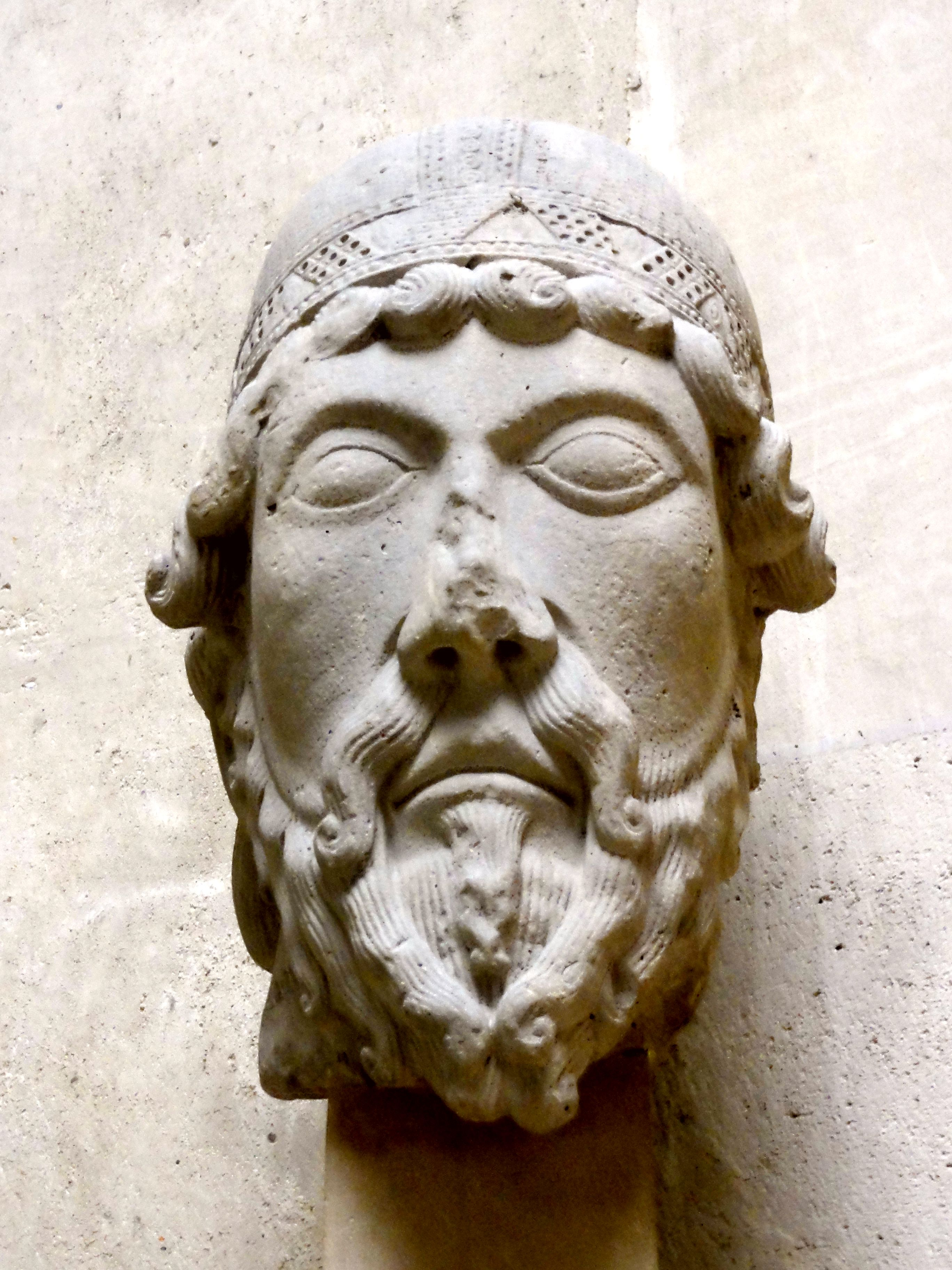
Early example of the Gothic style: Prophet's head, 1137–1140, originally in the Basilica of St. Denis

In general terms, the distribution of the images, derived from the consolidated Romanesque heritage, was produced according to the following scheme:

- Above the main entrance, there was invariably a scene with Christ, often the Last Judgment, Christ in Majesty or the Crucifixion.
- In the archivolts around it, there were figures of saints and angels, in the columns and friezes below, apostles and other Old Testament figures, or occasionally allegories, such as the Prudent Virgins and the Foolish Virgins, personifications of the Liberal Arts, or more recent historical characters such as some champion of the faith or a devout patron.
- If the church had secondary entrances, its spandrels could be decorated with a scene from the life of the Mary, mother of Jesus—whose cult saw a great increase in this period—and with some event from the life of the church's patron saint.

Far from being arbitrary choices, the images of the Gothic facade iconography were carefully selected to form a coherent didactic program for the observer, illustrating the evolution of the faith from its foundation by the Hebrew patriarchs to the advent of Christ incarnate with his doctrine of redemption, and finally presenting its teleological corollary in the apocalyptic condemnation of the wicked and the apotheosis of the good in the Kingdom of God.

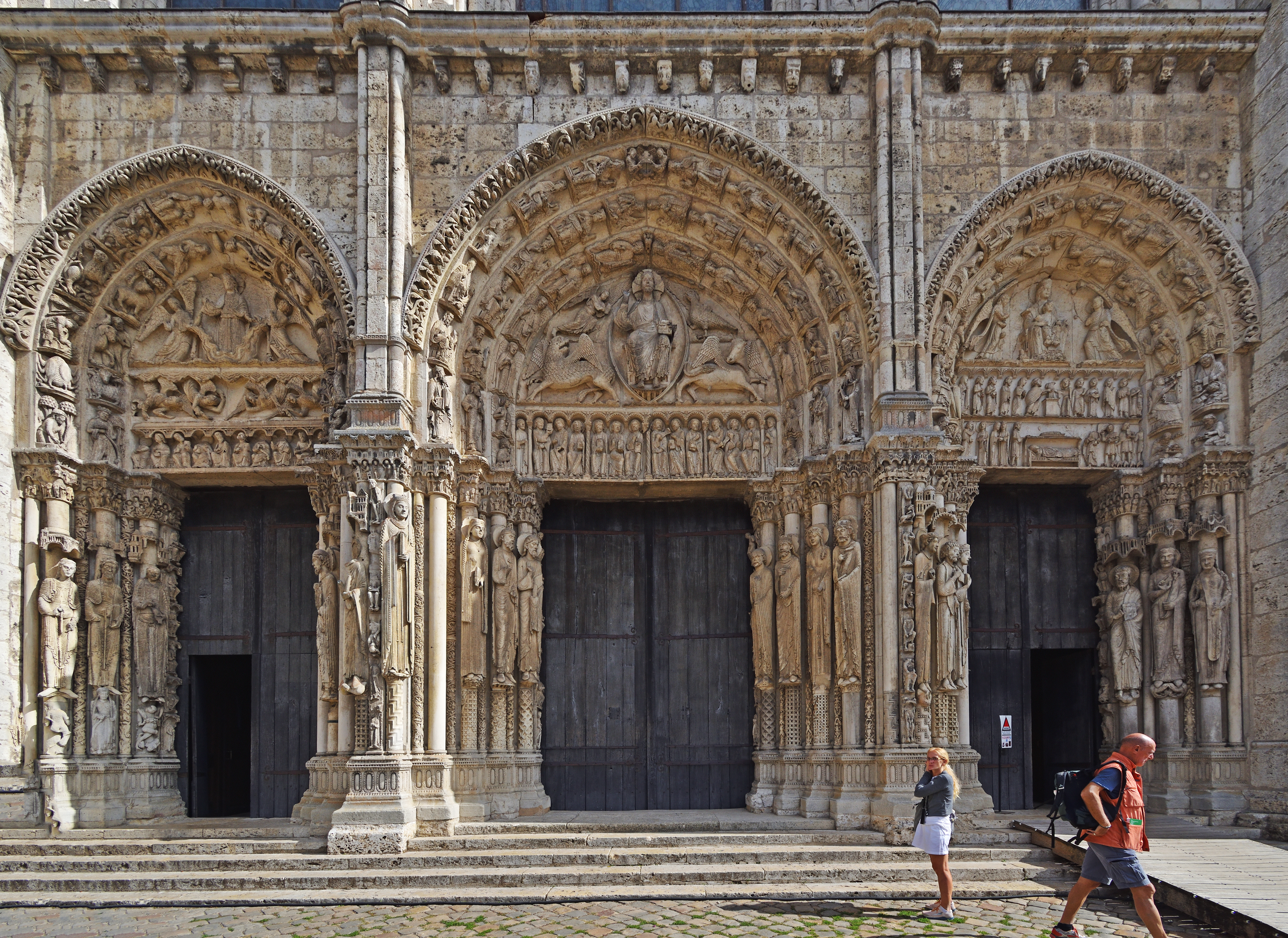
West portal of Chartres Cathedral, 1145–1155

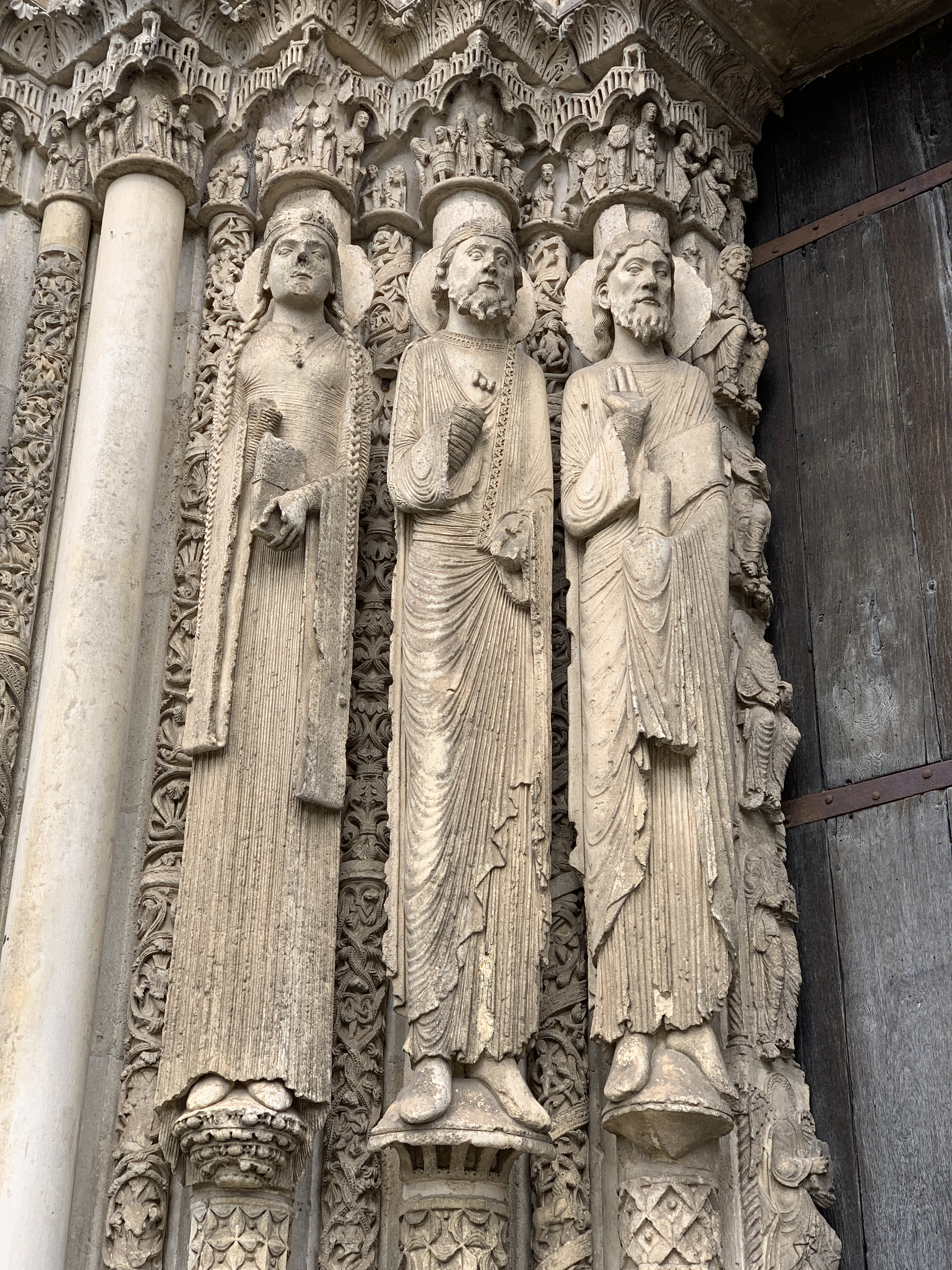
Columnar statues of the west portal of Chartres Cathedral, 1145–1155

At the same time, the approach to the motifs found in the Romanesque iconographic tradition also began to change. Until then, the scene most commonly found on church portals was that of the Last Judgment, with an emphasis on the torments awaiting the infidels in Hell.

Since the middle of the 11th century, Paris had become the biggest theological and cultural centre in Europe, with the presence of great philosophers and pedagogues such as Peter Abelard and Hugo of Saint Victor, and the action of several schools, which would merge to form around 1170 the University of Paris. In this more liberal academic environment, relatively independent of the Church, a humanistic philosophy gained ground, and the doctrine of Purgatory was structured, offering an escape route from Hell through a purifying stage prior to the ascent to Heaven.

At the same time, Mary, mother of Jesus, as well as other saints, began to be regarded as humanity's great advocates before the justice of Christ. In the process, the old tendency of the Christian faith to correct the sinner through fear and the threat of eternal damnation was tempered by visions that emphasized mercy rather than divine wrath and that took more account of the inherent fallibility of human nature.

Thus, the Last Judgment scenes continued to be a frequent motif, but now they were conceived to emphasize order, hope, and justice, showing the ways of salvation through repentance and the compassionate intercession of the saints. The very pronounced verticality of Gothic cathedrals, and their abundance of large windows that allowed great penetration of light into the interior—in contrast to the much heavier "square" forms and dark surroundings of Romanesque architecture—have been interpreted as a formal feature that mirrored this new, optimistic spiritual impulse.

Early Gothic remained essentially a French phenomenon, concentrated in the Paris region, and the first important monument to include sculpture was the Basilica of Saint-Denis, whose abbot, Suger, had a pre-existing Romanesque building remodeled between years 1137 and 1144 and adorned it with great riches. The special importance of Saint-Denis lay in that Charlemagne had been consecrated there, and it was the tomb of Charles Martel, Charles the Bald, and other founders of the kingdom. Therefore, it was a memorial to the Carolingian dynasty that at the same time became a symbol of the consolidation of the French monarchy—a process in which Suger played a prominent role in his capacity as advisor to the king and regent of France during the Second Crusade.

In addition, the Basilica was the monumental reliquary of Saint Denis of Paris, martyr and apostle of France, patron saint of Paris and protector of the kingdom, and Suger wished to make it the most important centre of French pilgrimage. It was thus clothed with spiritual and political meanings.

For Suger, who had been influenced by the writings of Pseudo-Dionysius, the church's ornamentation with gold objects and precious gems, stained glass windows, paintings, and sculptures was a valuable educational tool, being a way to visually present the doctrine to the people and make it more easily understandable. The clear organization of the tympanum scene differed from the compact arrangements of the Romanesque sets, and it's columnar statues were likewise an innovation.

The novelties proposed by Suger for the architecture and decoration of the facades, supported by the great prestige of Paris as a cultural, artistic, and university center, immediately began to radiate, appearing next in Chartres Cathedral, begun in 1145, whose west portal constitutes the most important sculptural ensemble in good condition of the first phase of Gothic. Its columnar sculptures have a very elongated design and function as an echo to the vertical emphasis of the building, and their forms still evidence of the Romanesque heritage in the linear treatment of the costumes and in their rigid attitudes. The faces, however, show a very naturalistic treatment that contrasts to the Romanesque schematization.

Both the sculptures of Saint-Denis and those on the other facades of Chartres were largely destroyed, mutilated, replaced, or poorly restored in later times, preventing a comprehensive understanding of their iconographic programs, but the Laon Cathedral, which has survived without much damage, provides a complete overview of the Early Gothic. Other good examples, later in time, are the cathedrals of Bourges, Le Mans, and Angers, with varying degrees of preservation. The production of sculpture during the Gothic period was so vast and varied—in Chartres alone the facade boasts more than two thousand pieces—that its detailed study is out of the question here, and it is only possible to trace its main evolutionary lines and its more generic characteristics.

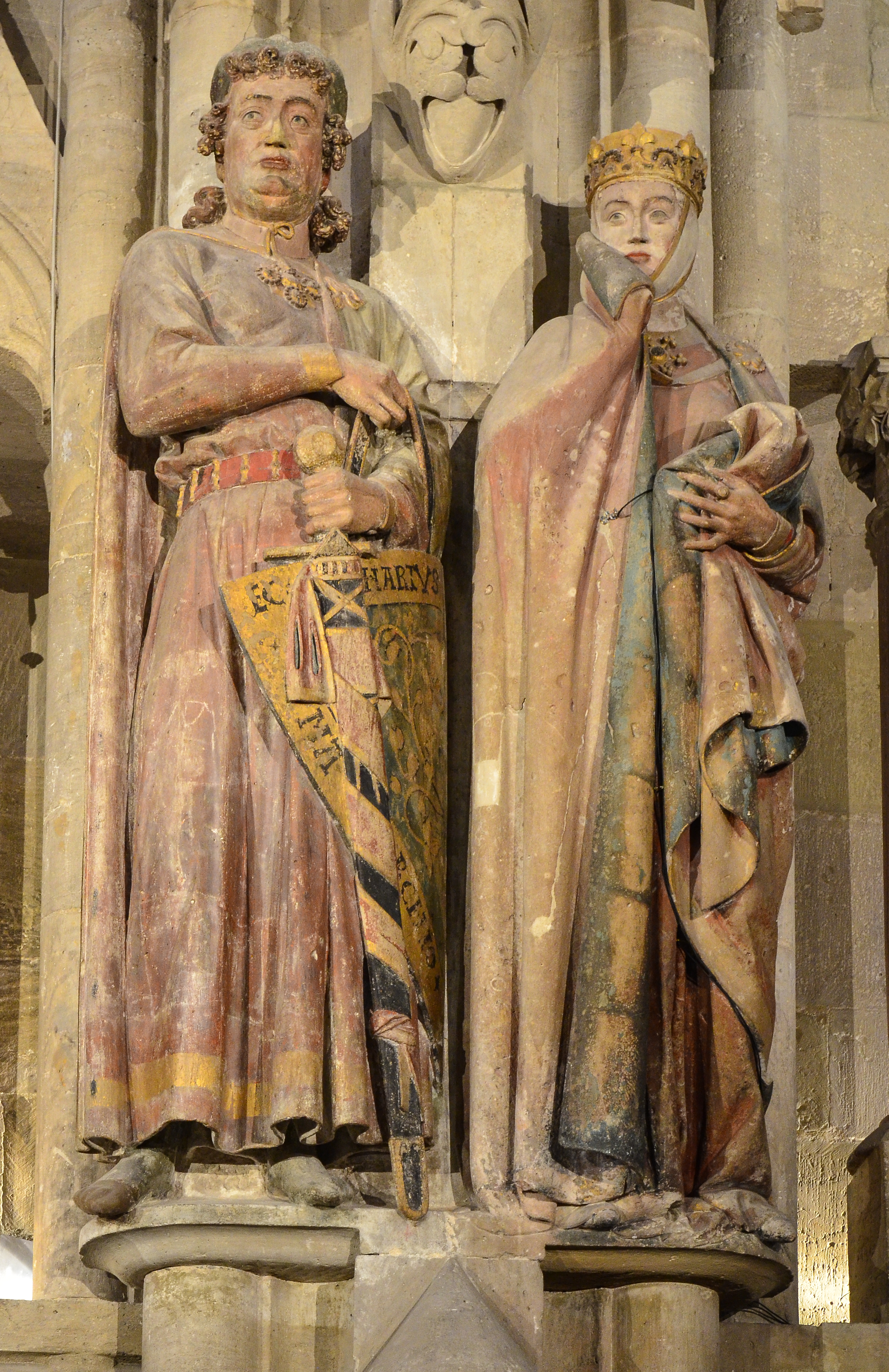
Statues of Ekkehard II and Uta von Ballenstedt, polychromed stone, 1240–1260, Naumburg Cathedral

=== High Gothic ===
Around 1200, its primitive language was already being modified by the progressive interest in naturalism, giving rise to the second stage of his evolution, called High Gothic.

The artists from the Meuse valley were important in this transition, notably Nicholas of Verdun and Renier of Huy, the first great masters to leave their mark in the history of Gothic sculpture, dedicating themselves to works in goldsmithery and bronze. In the cathedrals of Reims, Amiens, and Notre-Dame de Paris, the Gothic style is already free of the Romanesque influence, and their statues are of a very advanced naturalism.

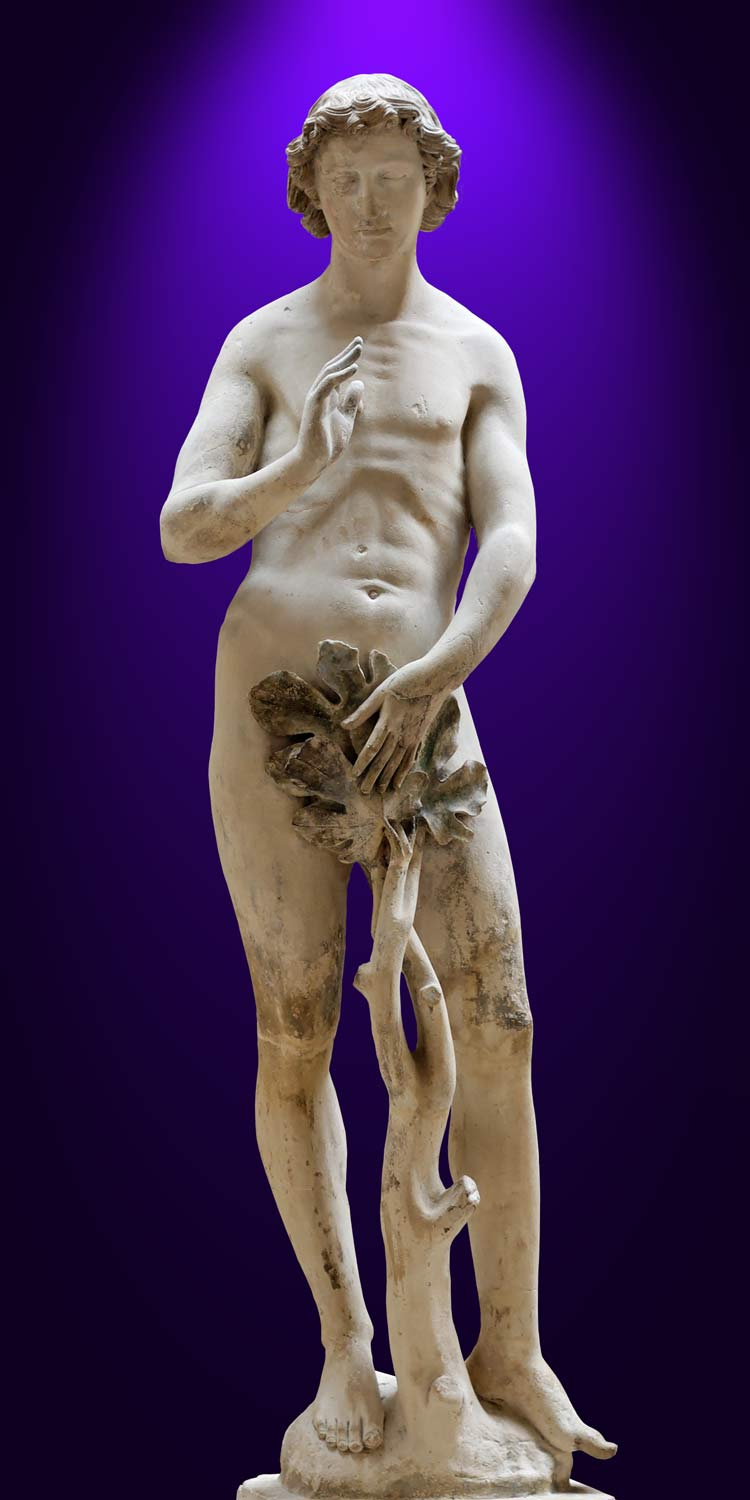
Adam, attributed to Pierre de Montreuil, marble, 1260, originally on the facade of Notre-Dame Cathedral in Paris

The statues are already independent of the columns and, possibly for the first time in the Middle Ages, the contrapposto is used to give the images more grace and movement, complemented with more dynamic attitudes in the limbs and a treatment of anatomical volumes that in many cases are no longer hidden by clothing. However, the Gothic contrapposto differs from the classical in that it seems more externally imposed than the result of a correct understanding of anatomy, and is more ornamental than organic.

While the humanism taught in schools of philosophy redefined fundamental principles of faith, it also made possible the absorption of elements of Classical antiquity in art, loosened the strict ethics that had guided moral thought in previous centuries, and directed the cultural atmosphere toward greater secularization, favoring the displacement of interest from the supernatural to the mundane and the human. It also rescued the value of the pure beauty of forms that had been lost since antiquity, considering, as did Thomas Aquinas, that Beauty was closely associated with Virtue and derived from the coordination of the parts of an object with each other in correct proportions and from the full expression of its essential nature.

If throughout the 13th century the general trend of sculpture, in technical terms, was to break free from architecture and gain autonomy, it still maintained an intimate relationship with its context, so that the ensembles tended to preserve a remarkable sense of unity and harmony. As for form, it moved toward a more detailed study of nature, seeking to reproduce the effects of light and shadow, the textures of fabrics, the subtle nuances of expression, the freshness of youth and the marks of old age. It seemed that all objects became vehicles of beauty and worthy of representation.

According to Hauser:

"[...] the great transition of the European spirit [was fulfilled here], from the Kingdom of God to Nature, from eternal things to the immediate environment, from the tremendous eschatological mysteries to the more harmless secrets of the created world. (...) Organic life, which after the end of antiquity had lost all value and significance, once more becomes honored, and the individual things of sensible reality are henceforth held up as subjects of an art that no longer requires supernatural justifications. There is no better illustration of this development than the words of St. Thomas Aquinas, 'God rejoices in all things, in each according to its essence.' They are the epitome of the theological justification of naturalism. All things, however small and ephemeral they may be, have an immediate relationship with God; everything expresses the divine nature in its own way and thus gains value and meaning for art as well."

In this process of valorization of the natural, the human body was especially benefited, since until then it was seen more as "a mass of rottenness, dust and ashes", as Peter Damian said in the 11th century. This aversion to the body had been an omnipresent note in the previous religious culture, and the representation of the man was characterized by a stylization that minimized his carnality. But now the symbolic schematism of the Romanesque and Early Gothic was definitively abandoned to reach in a short time a naturalism not seen since Greco-Roman art. The figure of Christ himself, previously represented mainly as Judge, King, and God, was humanized, and the adoration of his humanity came to be considered the first step to knowing true divine love. The achievement of naturalism was one of the most fundamental of the entire Gothic period, The achievement of naturalism was one of the most fundamental of the entire Gothic period, and made possible centuries later the even more remarkable advances of the Renaissance with regard to artistic mimesis and the dignification of the man in his ideal beauty. As Ladner said,

[...] by the end of the 11th-century, spiritualization had reached a climax beyond which it was impossible to proceed; and therefore the first half of the twelfth century was a turning point in the history of the image of the man in Christian art, as well as in the development of the doctrine of the likeness between the image of the man and that of God.

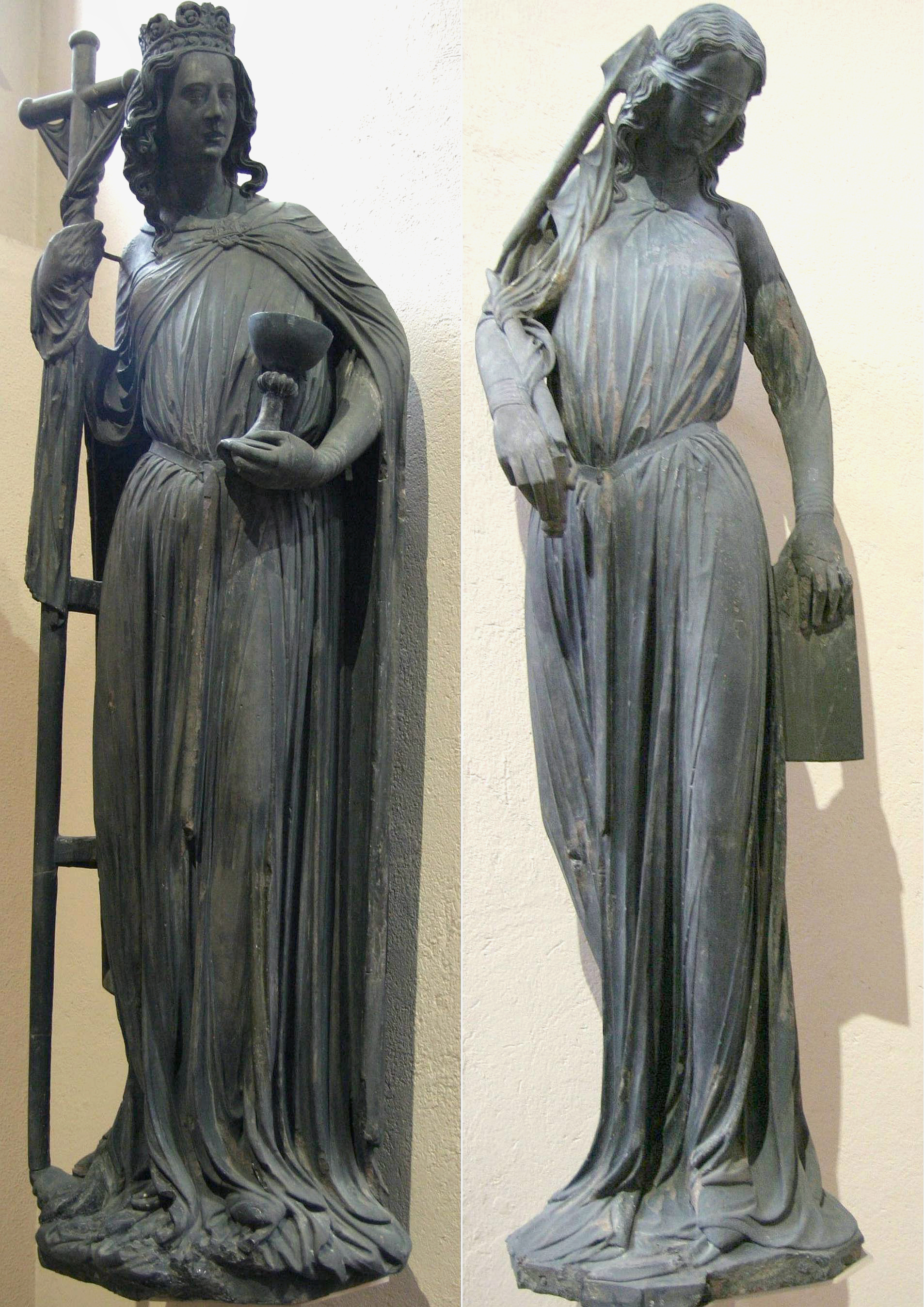
Ecclesia and Synagoga, statues on the facade of Strasbourg Cathedral, 1230

But it would be misleading to assume that by this time naturalism represented a liberation from the dictates of the Church and a radical abolition of interest in the spirit, and sculpture, like the other arts, manifested a constant dualism, seeking a compromise formula between both extremes.

While the attention to nature forced an enormous advance in sculptural technique, enabling it to imitate natural forms with great resemblance, there was a tendency to fragment the work as a whole, with the parts receiving more attention than the whole, and a sense of unity would only be achieved again at the end of this phase.

First of all, the fundamental data in this change of focus was that part of cultural conservatism dissolved and a genuine interest in all that was new developed. Chroniclers of the time expressed their enthusiasm at the emergence of a new order of values that would make it possible to build a more balanced society, where material well-being became a valid goal even though it was supposed to prepare for the salvation of the spirit. And since the idea that humanity had been renewed in Christ was reinforced, people no longer had to live so oppressed by the weight of mortality and sin, and could express their beauty, vitality, and joy without guilt.

Secondly, the old spiritual unilateralism, which rejected the imitation of reality in art and sought in it only the confirmation of religious doctrine, was broken, giving way to a vision that demanded the validation of abstract principles through sensitive experience, with faith entering into dialogue with reason.

With this, the old conception of art changed. While the desire to create figures that could adequately illustrate spiritual principles continued, the empiricism of the time demanded that the images should also be formally correct according to nature. These naturalistic tendencies did not show themselves all at once and in all places, and one must, of course, consider the permanence of deep-rooted local traditions giving the production a different, sometimes more archaic or exotic note. In addition, the presence of some important master with a more defined artistic personality may have inclined the style towards this or that aspect, although the main Gothic sculpture, at least until the next phase, was essentially anonymous and collective.

Yet a word must be said about the representation—especially in church decoration—of real or fantastic animals, since they held an important place in medieval thought.

Along with the purely ornamental decoration of vegetal motifs, there are frequent images of the lamb and the fish, substitutes for Christ, the dove that represented the Holy Spirit, the animals associated with the evangelists—eagle, bull, and lion—as well as those of mythical beasts such as the griffin, the dragon, and the basilisk, all conveying symbolic meanings that were associated with some moral lesson.

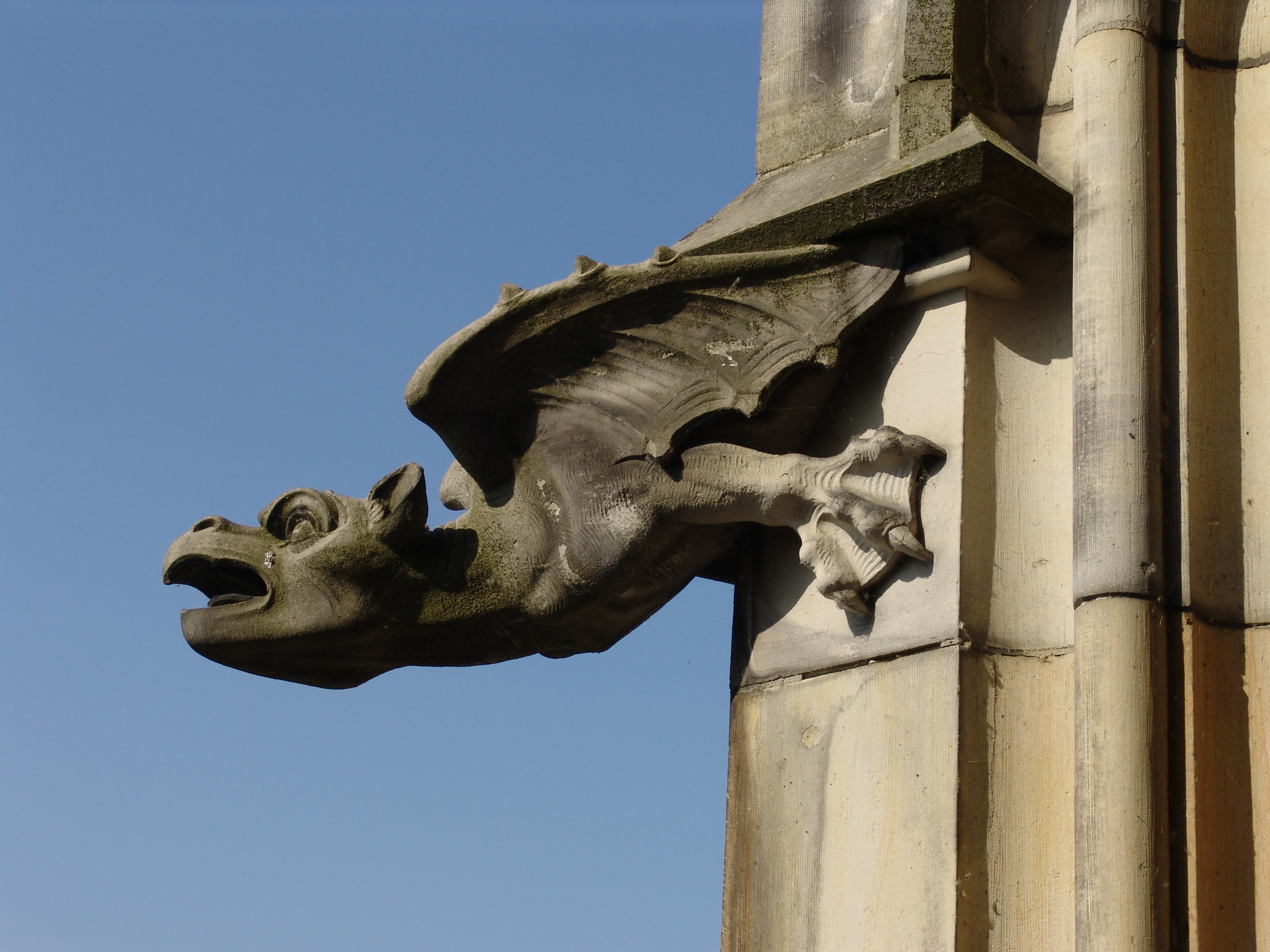
Gargoyle at Ulm Cathedral

The gargoyle shape was often used in cathedral architecture as a water drain. According to some traditions, it had the power to ward off evil spirits, but its interpretation is still uncertain. Moreover, the representation of fantastic animals offered a field free from ecclesiastical censorship, and in it, sculptors could indulge their fantasy and humor by elaborating a great variety of extravagant forms of great plastic effect.

By 1250, the architectural sculpture was already showing signs of decline, being replaced by abstract or floral ornamentation, with independent statuary, reliquaries, and especially the funeral monuments and tombs of the elite gaining importance. Two innovative features of this particular genre were the creation of small figures installed in niches, usually in an attitude of mourning, and the other was the emphasis on effigies, seeking an approximation of the real physiognomy of the dead.

Before the end of the 13th century, the Gothic style had already spread to Germany, Spain, England, Italy, and Scandinavia, paving the way for the next phase: International Gothic.

=== International Gothic ===
International Gothic comprises the period from mid-14th century to mid-15th century, with its peak around the year 1400. This was when the style became the lingua franca of European art, with a large circulation of artists and exchanges between regional schools. But when we talk about internationalization, this does not mean that the style became homogeneous. On the contrary, the emergence of large urban centers in various countries, all with their own traditions, created a panorama of great diversity, and the existence of wealthy patrons in many places made it possible to cultivate a wide range of new artistic possibilities.

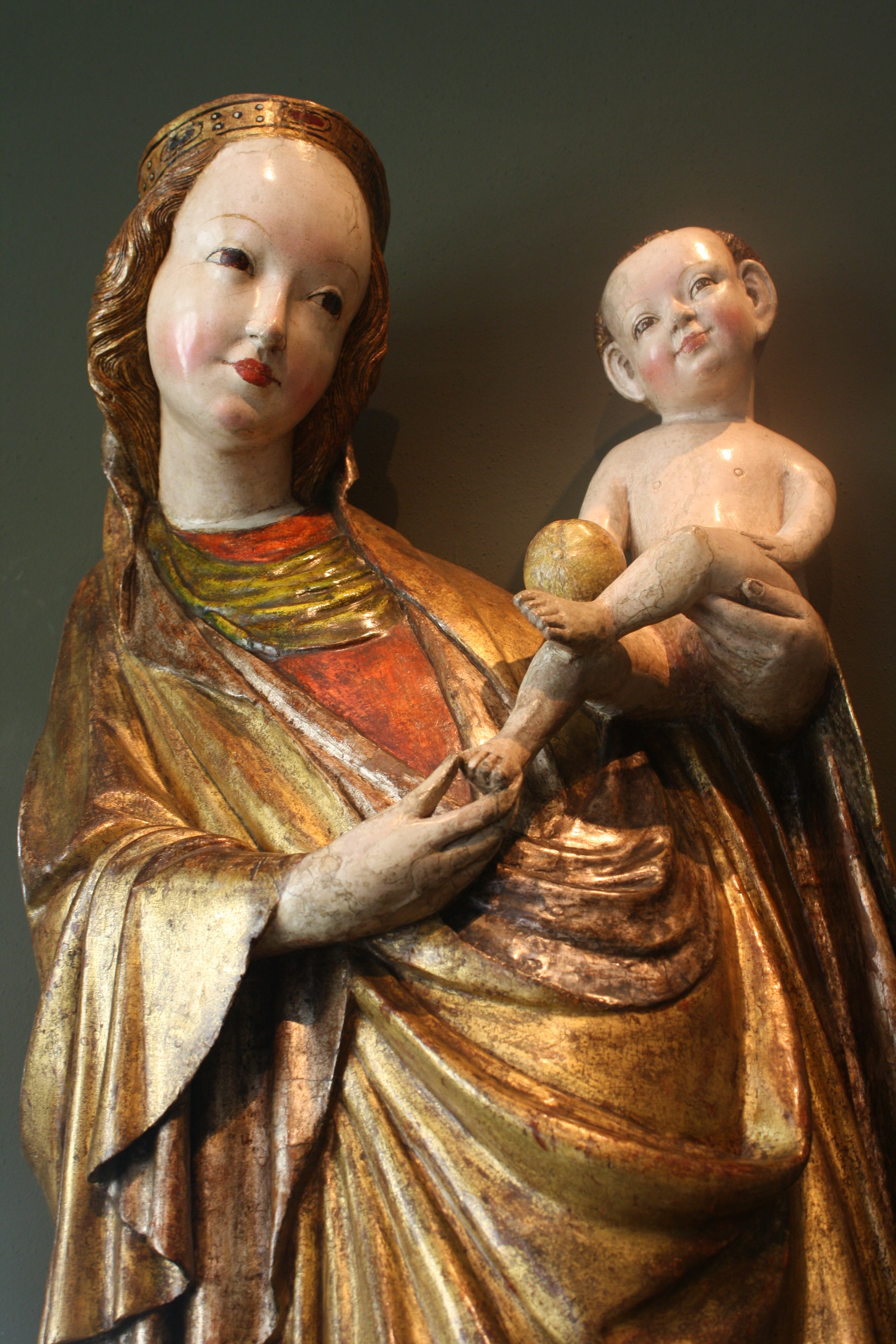
Anonymous: Beautiful Virgin Mary from Krużlowa, polychrome wood, 1400, Krakow, Poland.

The sculpture of this period is no longer monumental, except for sporadic cases, and it concentrates on portable pieces,retables and altars.

The 13th century, as we have seen, was characterized by the emergence of naturalistic rhetoric derived from the appreciation of the superficial appearances of objects in the world, even though its foundation was metaphysical. If International Gothic sculpture carried this trend forward on the one hand, on the other it gave it a new approach, which served the distinctive atmosphere of devotio moderna, a movement of religious revivalism that began among the mendicant orders and soon spread among the laity.

This "modern devotion" was more introspective and intimate but could easily spill over into collective outbursts of mystical fervor. It is not surprising, in the face of this more emotionally inclined faith, the multiplication of works with dramatic themes such as the scenes of the Passion of Jesus and the Pietà—which had a more immediate affective appeal and a confessional and penitential character that had not been explored until then, and which were linked to the popularization of the doctrines about indulgences and Purgatory, and to the understanding of Salvation as an essentially individual and subjective problem, in contrast to the ideas about a collective eschatology that had predominated before.

The new iconography that was formed, where images of death and suffering became commonplace, was also a mirror of an unstable social situation full of paradoxes, when wars were frequent, the daily life of the people was marked by gratuitous violence, hunger was a constant shadow, the frequent popular revolts against abusive taxes were rigorously repressed, and epidemics decimated the population. (Note: The Black Death of 1347–1350 took one third of the lives in Europe) The same crowd that followed a procession with tears of sorrow in their eyes could gather in the town square and enjoy a public execution with no shortage of cruelty.

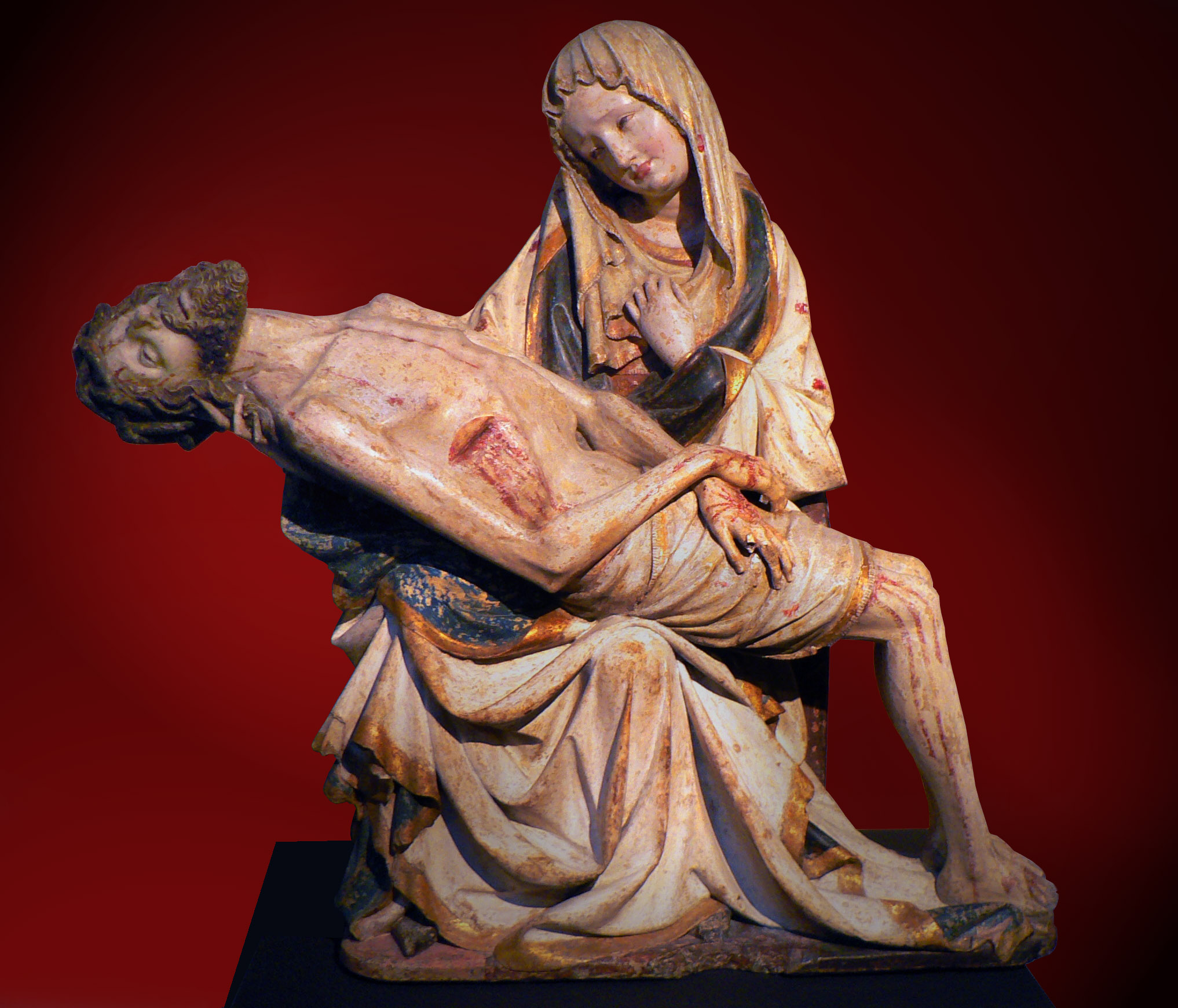
Anonymous: Pietà Křivákova, polychrome wood, 1390–1400, Bohemia or Moravia

But other factors contributed to give diversity to the International Gothic, a period that marked, as Huizinga said, "the beginning of the end of the medieval world."

The middle class was growing and becoming organized, and began to manage large sectors of public affairs. The feudal system was declining and was gradually replaced by a proto-capitalist economic model dominated by the values of the bourgeoisie, which actually became the cultural vanguard of the period and took a leading role in the patronage of the arts.

Moreover, the individualism that characterized this new economy, together with the birth of a new urban culture—which moved away from traditional values formulating more dynamic ones, favoring a great transit between social classes—were reflected in the arts in a way that privileged realist aspects, profane interests, and private preferences, where the proliferation of portraits is exemplary in this regard, often going into unprecedented psychological characterizations.

At the same time, the persistence of sophisticated courtly culture, typified in the courts of the House of Valois of France—who were among the greatest patrons of the period and which was inspired by the traditions of chivalry and the ideals of courtly love—gave much of the production of this phase a pronounced ornamental character, emphasizing the decorative of the costumes, the richness of the textures, and the elegance of the gestures, although the prevalence of this code also crystallized the art consumed in the courts in conventionalized formulas.

In this sense, the creation of the typology of the Beautiful Madonna, one of the most esteemed in the International Gothic, is illustrative. Its exact function and origin are a matter of debate, but it seems to have derived in the orbit of both courtly and popular culture, embodying a timeless ideal of beauty and fusing the erudite grace of the courts with the sentimental piety of the people.

Another aspect of artistic-religious practices that should be mentioned refers to the resurrection of formulas from earlier periods. As already mentioned, in the great devotional wave that occurred during the International Gothic period, the production of reliquaries and cult statuary was enormously intensified, and many of the sacred images produced then were derivations or direct copies of a famous prototype whose veneration was ancient. This made their relationship to the original image obvious and lent the new one an archaic character, and, more importantly, gave it a more authentic sacredness, even more so when reinforced by some suggestive popular legend, such as those that ran at the time saying that certain famous statues and icons had miraculously multiplied and worked wonders also through their copies. Even if the copies were not linked to any specific folklore, they were expected to enjoy the same privileges and have the same powers as the original. This historicism became even more marked in the transition to the Late Gothic.

Retable of the Old Cathedral of Coimbra, 1498–1502, work by Olivier de Gand with polychromy by Jean d'Ypres

=== Late Gothic ===
Late Gothic is the final phase of the style, but it was not a phase of decadence. On the contrary, it was then that the Gothic period produced some of its most imposing, rich, and complex works.

The phase is roughly bounded between the mid-15th and mid-16th centuries and represents the corollary of what had been achieved in the previous phase with regard to naturalism and internationalism. But there are significant differences in European society at that time that may help explain the artistic transformation.

In the economy, the opening of new trade routes in view of the Age of Exploration shifted the axis of international trade to the nations of Western Europe. Portugal and Spain were rising as naval powers, accompanied by France, England and the Netherlands. Gold and other riches from the American, African and Asian colonies flowed into them in unprecedented quantities, sustaining their political ascendancy and making possible a veritable surge of promotion of the arts.

In politics, the invasions of Italy by France, Germany, and Spain led to a radical change in the balance of power on the continent, culminating in the Sack of Rome in 1527, which caused many Italian artists and intellectuals to flee to other places. This phenomenon meant the large-scale dissemination of the Italian classical-Renaissance tradition since, in Italy, the Gothic period had long been superseded, crowning the intense circulation of Italian works of art and classical texts that had already been happening for some time.

Likewise, the movable type press, newly invented by Gutenberg, made it possible to spread culture in general and humanist texts in particular much more efficiently, widely and quickly among all countries. Thus, various Italian aesthetic elements became present in the art of most places where the Gothic style remained strong, giving rise to a multiplicity of eclectic currents that are often described already as part of international Mannerism.

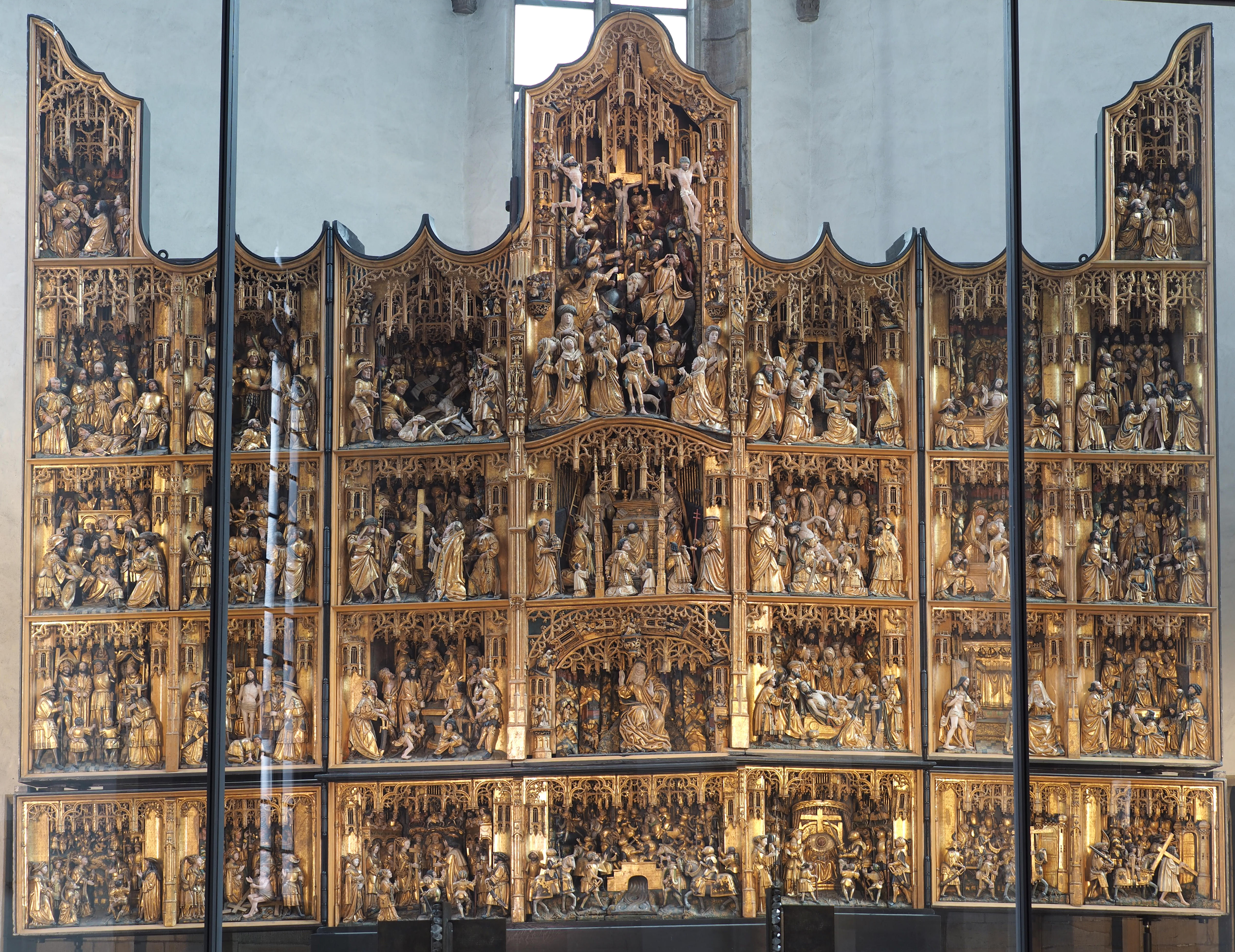
Antwerp Retable in St. Peter's Church in Dortmund, 1521

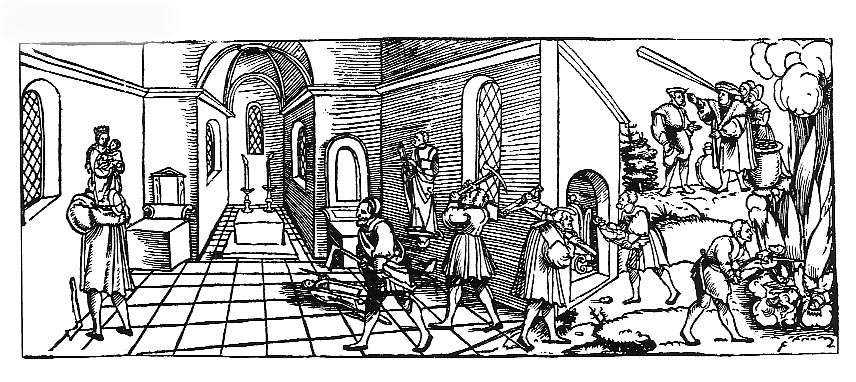
Erhard Schön, (colored) woodcut showing an episode of iconoclasm, c. 1530, Castle Museum Gotha

Another obvious trend of the period was the development of a taste for the complex and the ultra-sophisticated, which is strikingly evident in the large retables with several juxtaposed scenes that replaced the old facade portals as a form of didactic illustration of doctrine in a large narrative panel. The very structure of the retables, which framed the scenes in elaborate architectural structures, often resembled a church facade.

Like the portals, these large structures had a clearly organized iconographic program, illustrating the divine hierarchies that had a reflection on Earth in the form of the established Church, with the Vicar of Christ as its leader, plus his body of ministers and his flock of faithful. Such retables were usually offered by the community and therefore had a significance, besides doctrinal and social, as they served as identity symbols of that community. The richer and more complex they were, the more prestige they brought to the town or congregation.

Most of the retables had folding side panels and when on great feasts, the flaps were opened and the large ensemble was left free for viewing. The theatrical effect of the unveiling of the work took on a character of sacred epiphany and at the same time of a collective profane celebration, since figures from the people and the civil hierarchy were often represented beside Christ, the angels and saints.

The Gothic period ended its cycle on a somber note: the iconoclastic crisis triggered by the Reformation.

The Reformers, besides putting an end to the unity of Christianity—that until then had been one of the strongest elements of cultural cohesion in Europe—proposed new religious concepts that affected the representational modes, actually leaning towards the summary condemnation of sacred representation and triggering several episodes of mass destruction of sacred images which stripped countless temples converted to Protestantism of priceless artistic treasures. A witness writing in Ghent, in 1566, said that the fires that consumed the images there could be seen more than 15 km away.

Catholic countries did not have this problem, as the Council of Trent reaffirmed the importance of sacred art, but they could not evade the international debate that formed around the role of cult images, managing to strike a compromise between their devotional and substitutionary function for the divine image, and their character as works of art in their own right. Although Luther tried to maintain a conciliatory position, admitting the possibility of preserving certain images as testimonies of holy history, other Reformed leaders were uncompromising.

This large-scale destruction of religious art is one of the factors that make the study of this period particularly difficult; but on the other hand, it led to the formulation of a new aesthetic theory that was one of the foundations for the modern concept of art.

According to Belting:

"Luther, who simply argued for the grounding of religion in life, was certainly more a witness than the cause of what has been called 'the birth of the modern age from the spirit of religion.' Religion, however combatively reasserted itself, was no longer the same. It fought for the space it had occupied until then, but finally it was given the segregated place in society that we are now accustomed to. Art was sometimes admitted to this place, sometimes excluded from it, but it ceased to be a religious phenomenon in itself. Within the realm of art, images symbolized the new, secularized demands of culture and aesthetic experience. In this sense, a unified concept of the image was discarded, but the loss was masked by the label 'art' that is generally applied to it today."

== Regional schools ==
=== France ===
The Gothic style of the first two periods was an essentially French artistic expression. From mid-14th century, following the general European trend, monumental sculpture declined but smaller sculpture flourished. Likewise, the tendency toward naturalism was the predominant note.

Devotional statues proliferated within the theme, showing lines of great delicacy and grace and an ornamental character. The tombs remained more or less similar to those of the 13th century, except that they now bore more accurate portraits of the dead, notably those of Charles V of France and his two immediate successors, made by André Beauneveu. Charles V was even one of the greatest patrons of his time, making Paris one of the most important sculpture centres and attracting Flemish artists such as Jean de Liège—supported in this by his brother John, Duke of Berry, whose court settled alternately in Poitiers and Bourges, using the sculptors Jean de Cambrai and the aforementioned Beauneveu, among others.

Under Philip II, the duchy of Burgundy—which in his time included Flanders—took a prominent place as a cultural centre, boasting several notable Flemish sculptors such as Claus Sluter and Jean de Marville. After the Duke's death the prestige of the Burgundian school began to decline, but at the end of the 15th century it is worth remembering Antoine le Moiturier, traditionally regarded as the author of the famous Tomb of Philippe Pot.

In the same period, the Franco-Flemings were responsible for a certain resurgence of architectural decoration, a trend that continued into the 16th century and left important testimonies in Rouen Cathedral and Amiens Cathedral, including facade pieces and reliefs in the interiors. Also in the 15th century, a prolific movement known as Détente emerged in the Loire Valley, rescuing the old idealism of the 13th century tempered with some elements of the Italian Renaissance that was beginning to make itself known. Its themes were popular types, and so it had great success among the lower classes, but it also cultivated the sacred, especially the Madonnas and groups of the Holy Sepulchre.

By the end of the 15th century, the movement influenced all sculptural production in France, and among its exponents were Michel Colombe and Jacques Bacot.

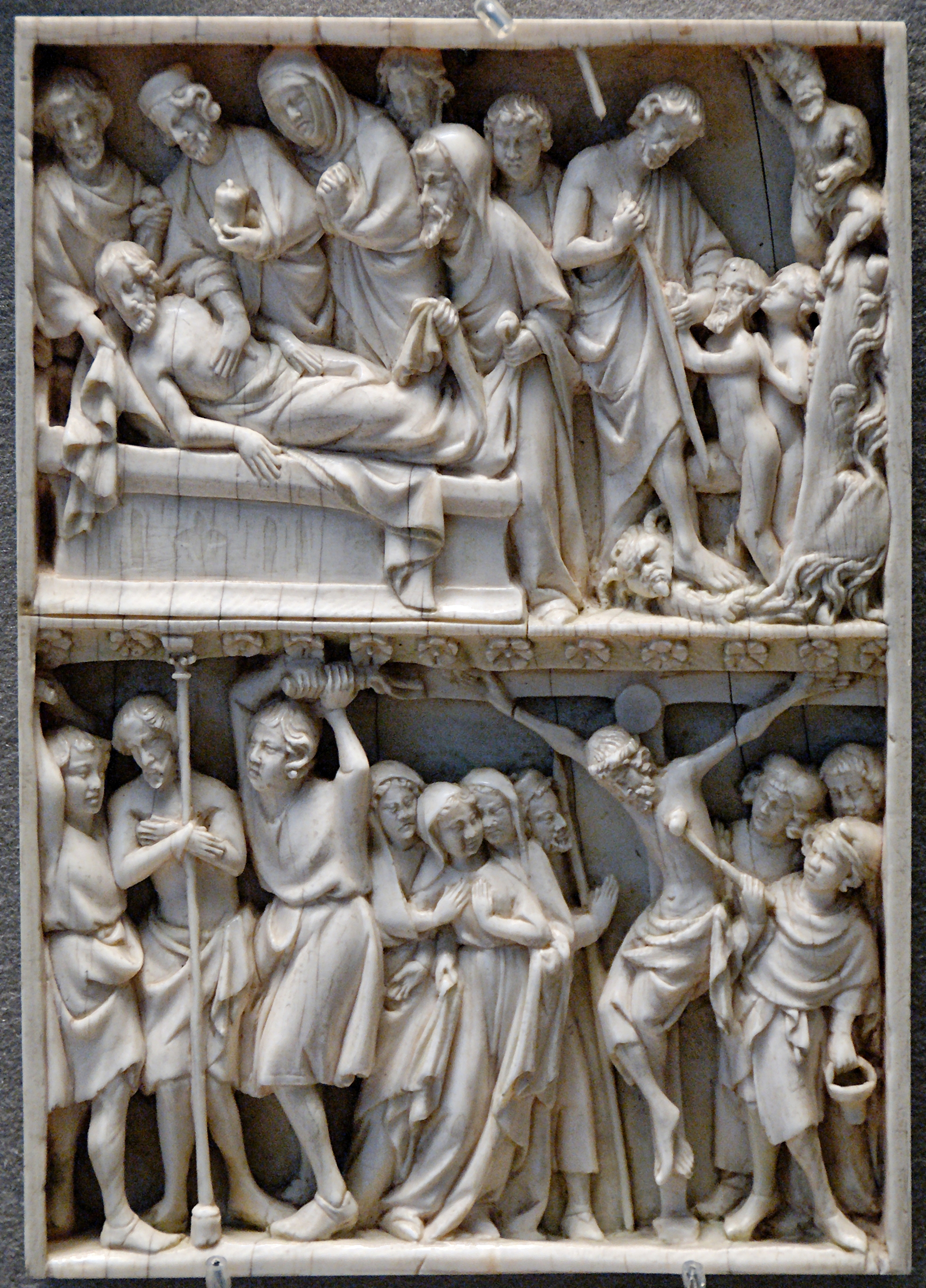
Anonymous: Diptych of the Passion of Christ, ivory with traces of polychromy, early 14th century, Paris

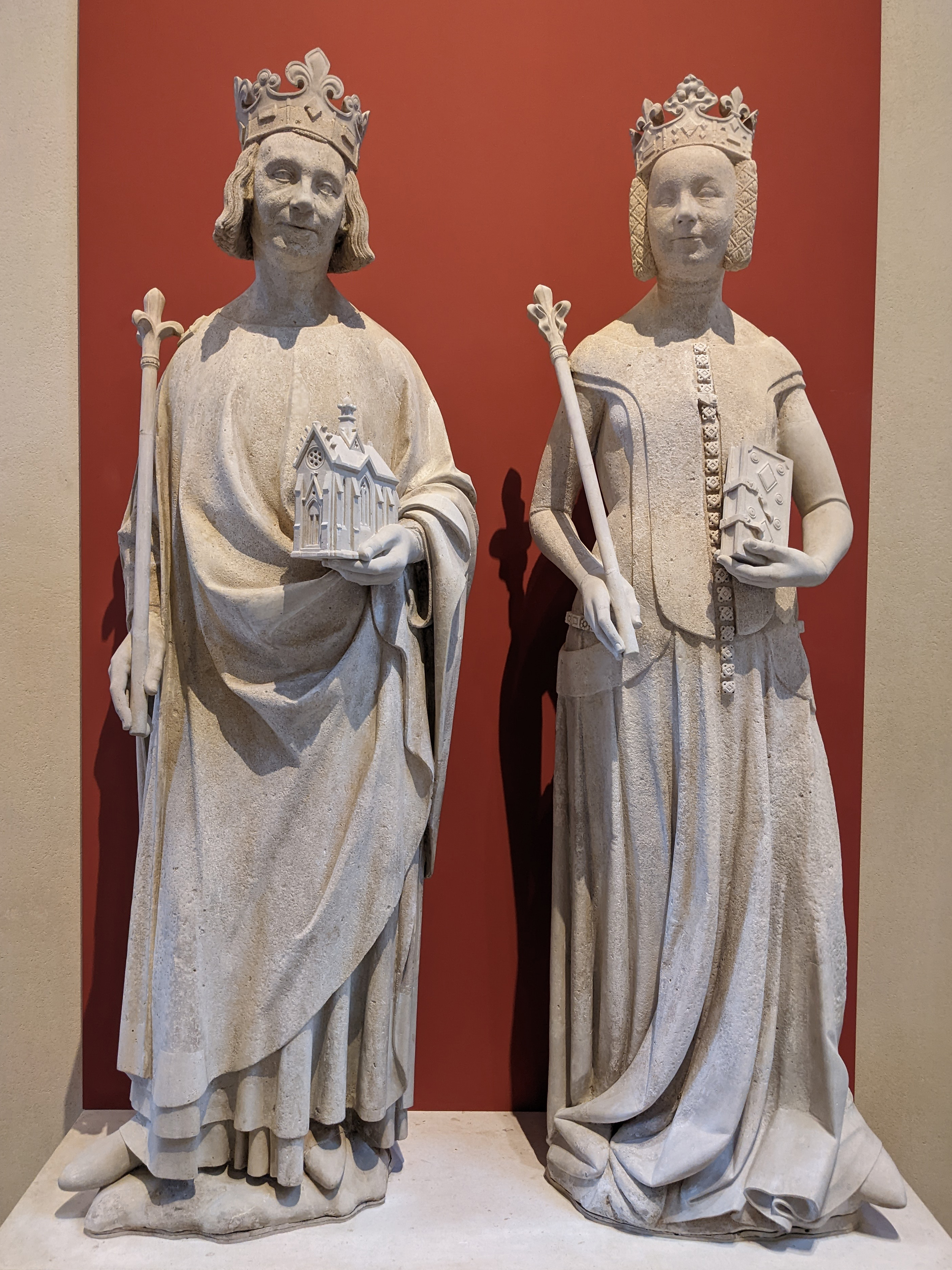
Anonymous: Statues of Charles V and Joanna of Bourbon, mid-14th century, Paris

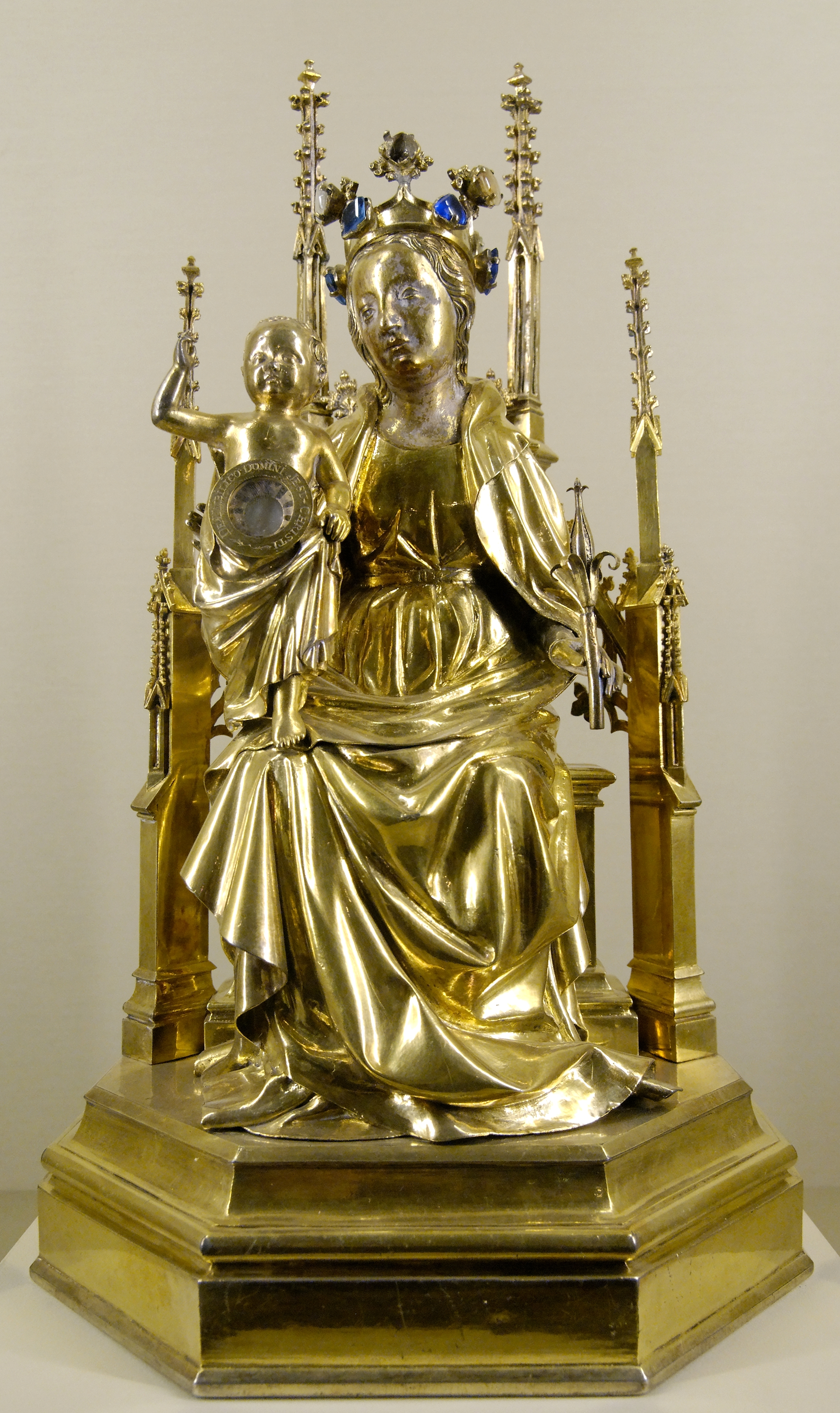
Anonymous: Reliquary of the umbilicus of Christ, silver-gilt, 1407, Paris

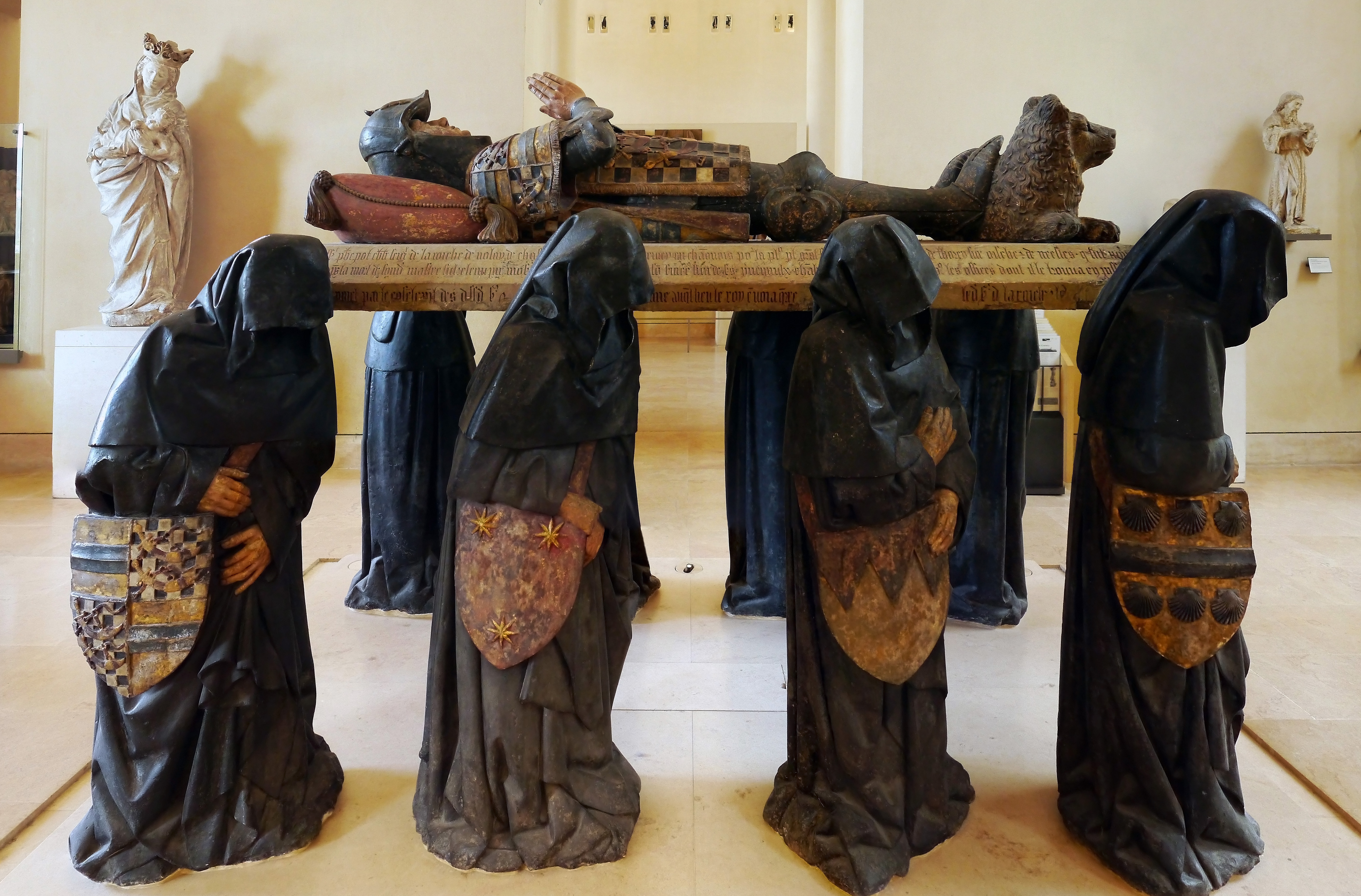
Antoine le Moiturier, Tomb of Philippe Pot, 1494, Burgundy
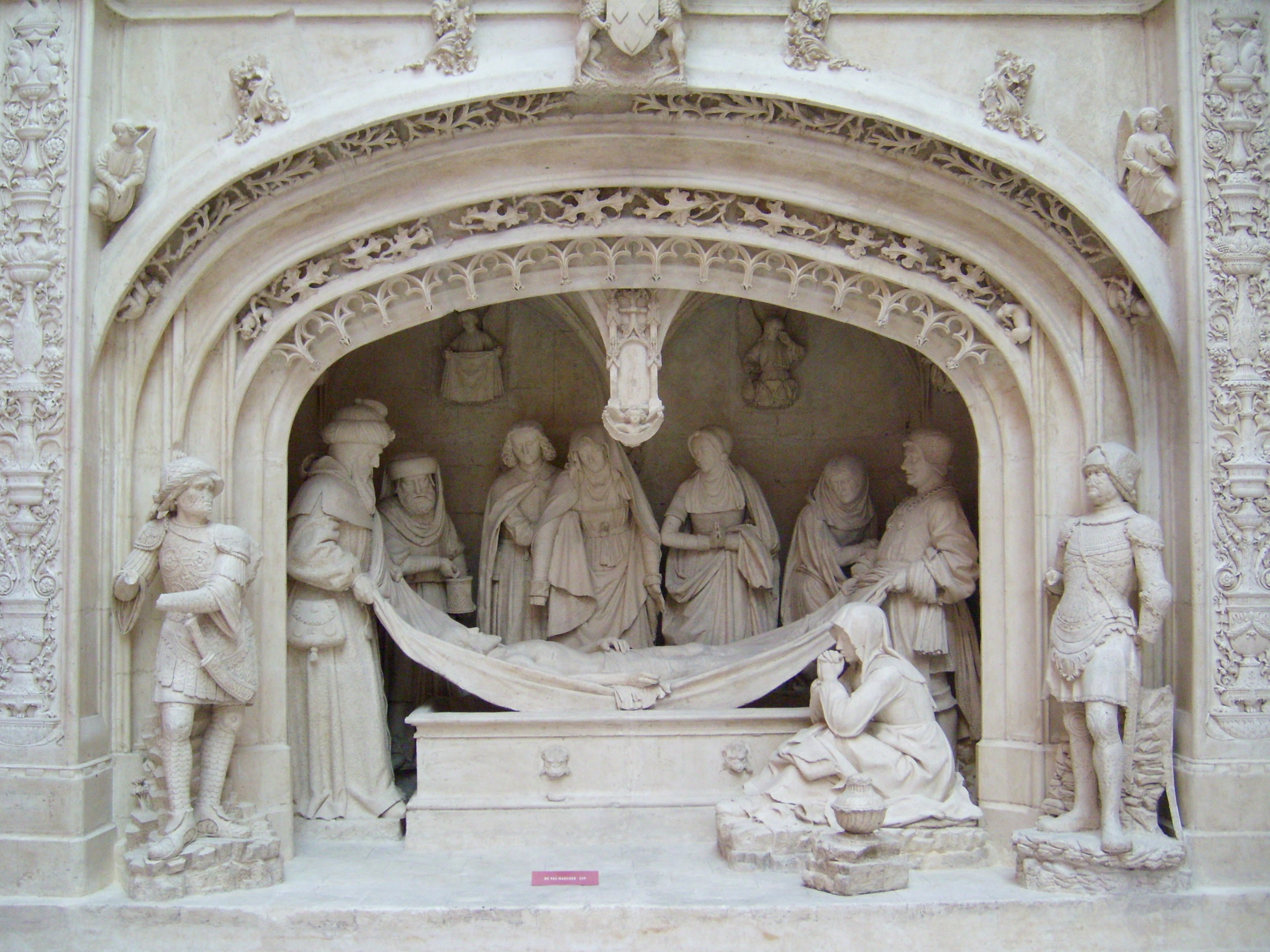
School of Michel Colombe, Entombment of Christ, marble, late 15th century, Solesmes Abbey, Sarthe

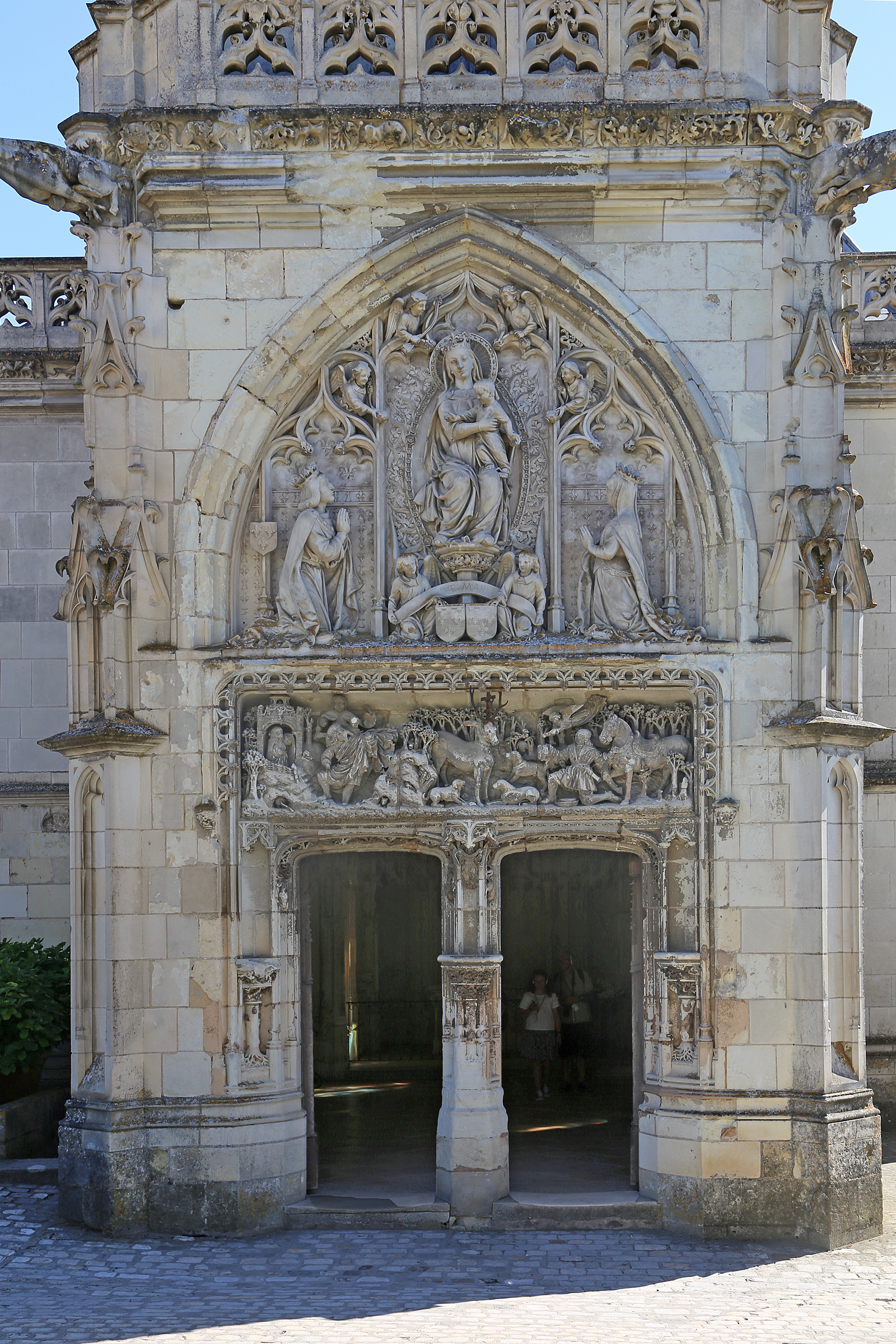
Facade of the Saint Hubert chapel of Château d'Amboise, 1491–1496

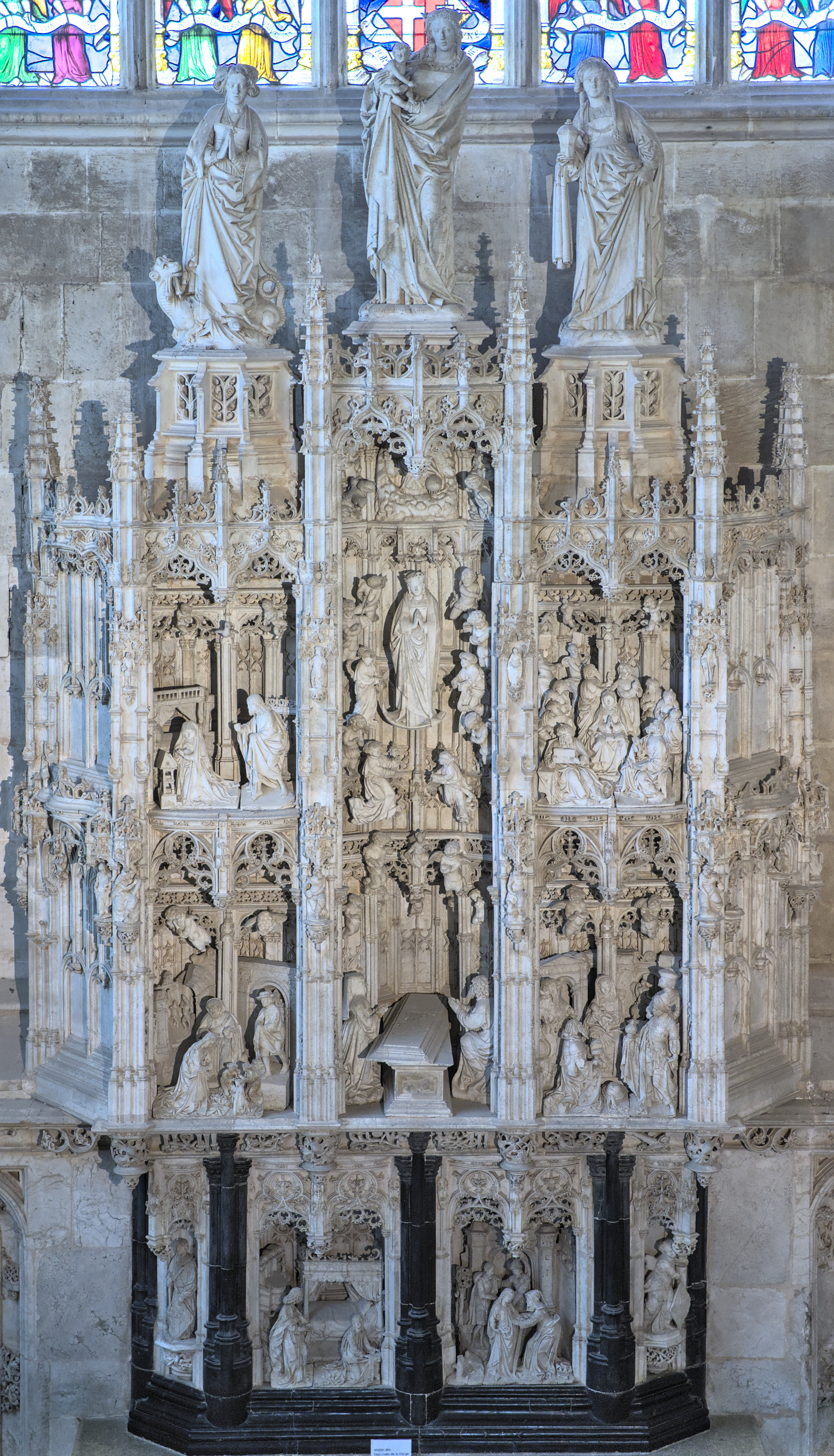
Anonymous, Altarpiece in Bourg-en-Bresse Cathedral, marble, 1532

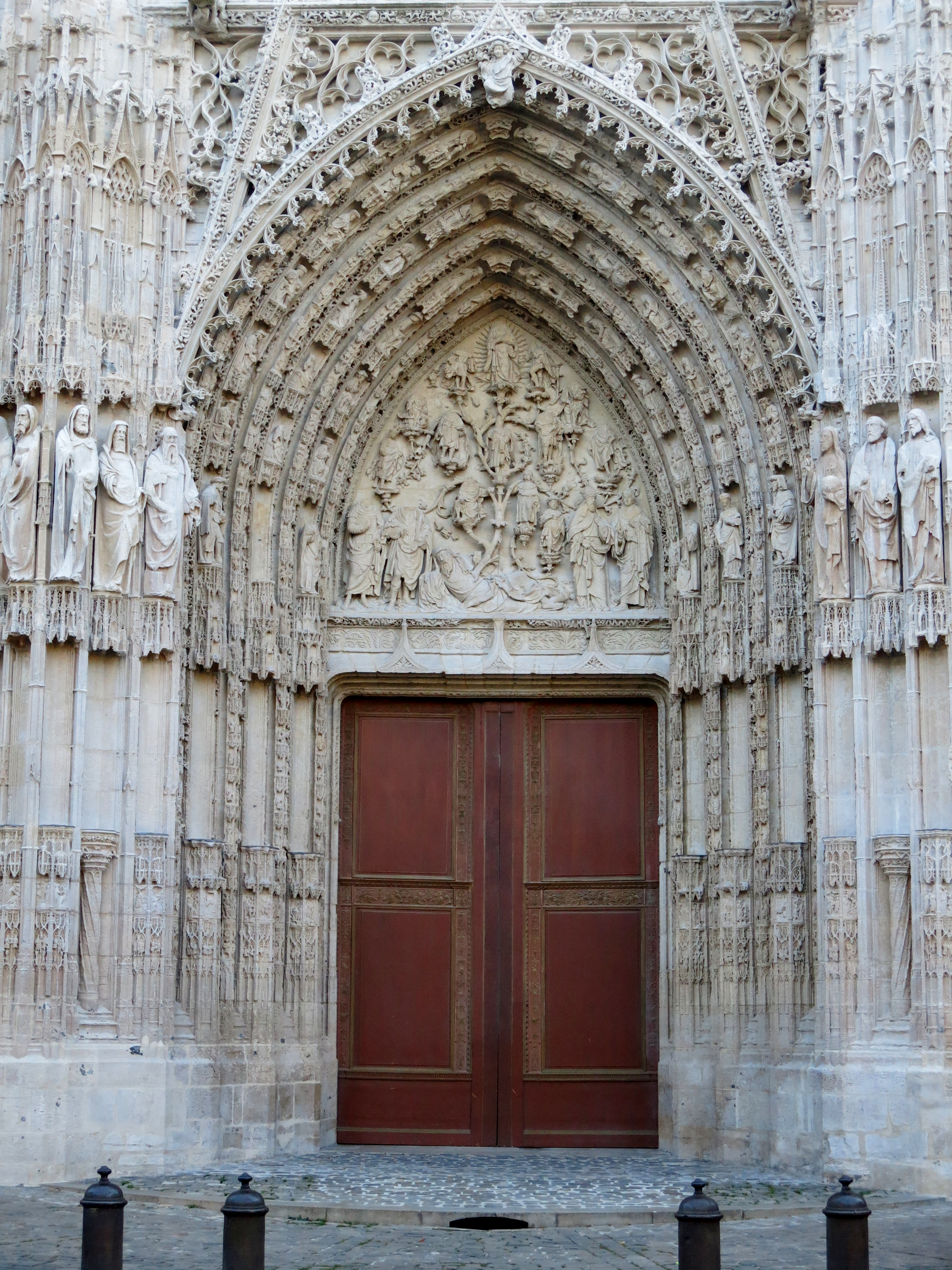
Portico of Rouen Cathedral, 16th century

=== Germany and Central Europe ===
In Germany, the Gothic style appeared around 1220 and was received through sculptors trained in France, and although the sculpture is quite employed in facades, they are in general less rich than their French models—but the French influence always remained strong. On the other hand, naturalism was soon more emphasized, possibly because of the permanence of more classical elements in its tradition, preserved by the Carolingian Renaissance of the 8th century and by contacts with the Byzantine Empire.

Illuminated manuscripts preserved from late antiquity in monasteries and ecclesiastical collections may also have been an influence in presenting classicist models for sculptors. There were statues in the 13th century Bamberg Cathedral that can already be considered true portraits—such as the famous Bamberg Horseman—and the same happened in Naumburg Cathedral, with several very lively figures. Also, from the end of the century, there is a clearer tendency toward dramatic intensification and humanization of sacred themes, as can be seen in the proliferation of scenes such as the Dance of Death, Our Lady of Sorrows, and Christ as the Man of Sorrows. A typology of the Pietà, intended for private devotion, is also formulated there. The best German monumental examples are found in the cathedrals of Strasbourg (Franco-German), Freiberg, Bamberg, Magdeburg, and Naumburg.

Throughout the International Gothic, any regional differences dissolved, and the style tended to homogenize, but the general level of quality suffered a median levelling. A standardization can also be seen in the characterization of the characters, with conventional stereotypes that no longer have the individuality of the previous phase. In this phase, the German Gothic only differs from the French in the choice of local ethnic traits in character design.

However, this same choice, which at first was only circumstantial, superficial, later gave birth to an art with unmistakable national characteristics. But unlike France, which was beginning to abandon monumental sculpture, this genre continued to be widely practised and there are many churches in various cities that have good examples: Xanten, Cologne, Erfurt, Worms, Ulm, Augsburg, Vurtzburg, and Nuremberg. But of all the genera, the most important in this phase were the small pieces of private devotion, especially the Madonnas and the tombs, whose effigies still show quite individual traits.

In the Late Gothic, the Italian Classical-Mannerist and Flemish influences became more prominent, but the typically Germanic tendencies asserted themselves powerfully, formulating an often brutal and dramatic realism which relies not on exact anatomical description but on the extravagant movement of bodies, of the accumulation of characters that are often compressed into a tiny space, of the convoluted folding of garments that acquire value by themselves without taking into account the underlying bodily volumes, and of the superabundant accessory decoration, which at times becomes exhaustive in its detail. The Swabian school in particular was celebrated for achieving a pathetic intensity in its devotional pieces. However, the general character of this production may be perceived as bourgeois, for the human types are popular, without idealism, and the taste for the exaggerated, the picturesque, and the expressive sometimes brings the plays close to caricature.

Among the many masters who became famous in this period and worked in various German regions, we can highlight Tilman Riemenschneider, Michael Pacher, Bernt Notke, Veit Stoss, and Adam Kraft.

The German Gothic school was, after the French, the most important for the spread of the style to the rest of Europe. Many of its artists travelled extensively throughout the continent, leaving works in Poland, the Czech Republic, England, Sweden, Denmark, and elsewhere.

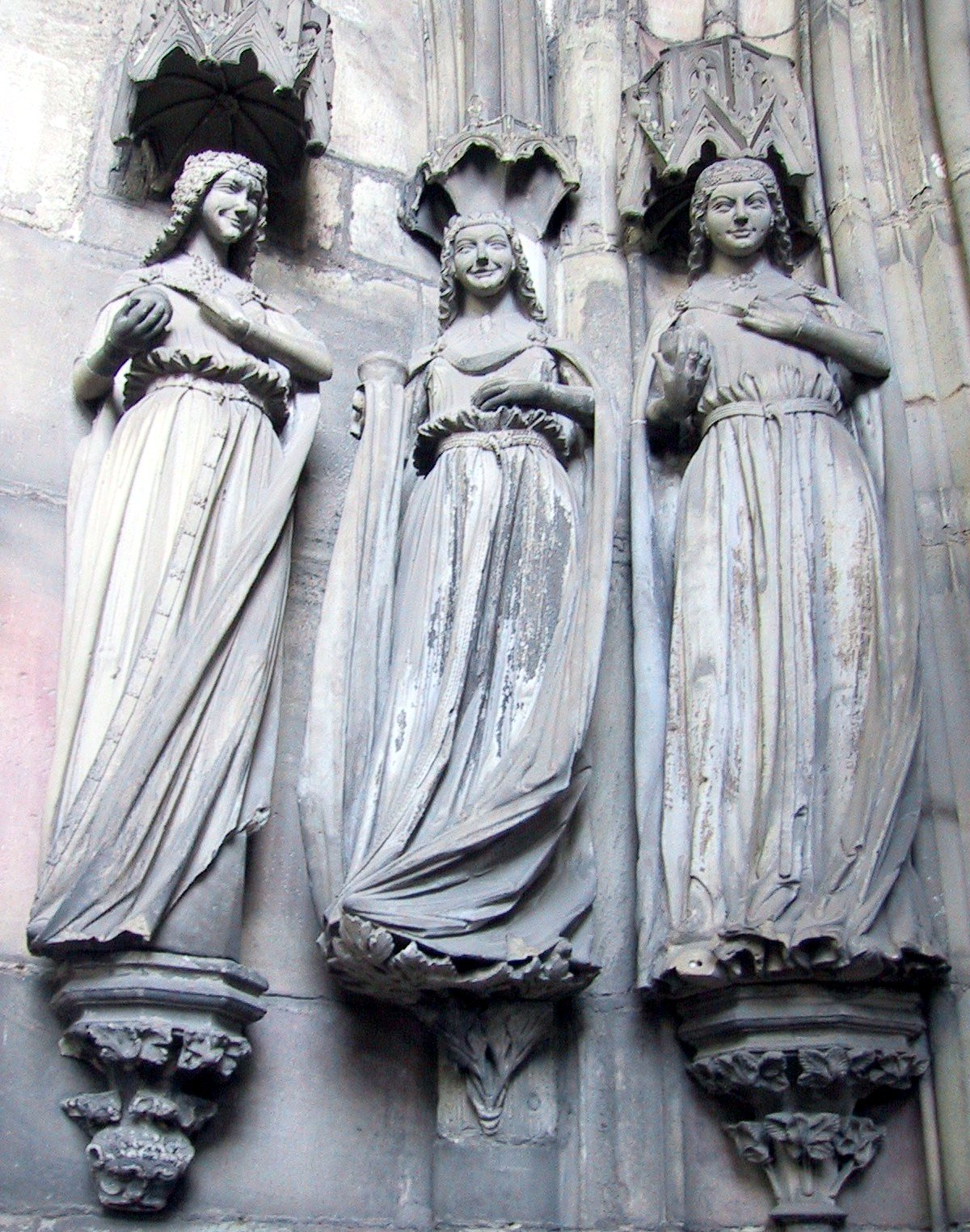
Anonymous, Three Wise Virgins, 1250, facade of Magdeburg Cathedral, Germany

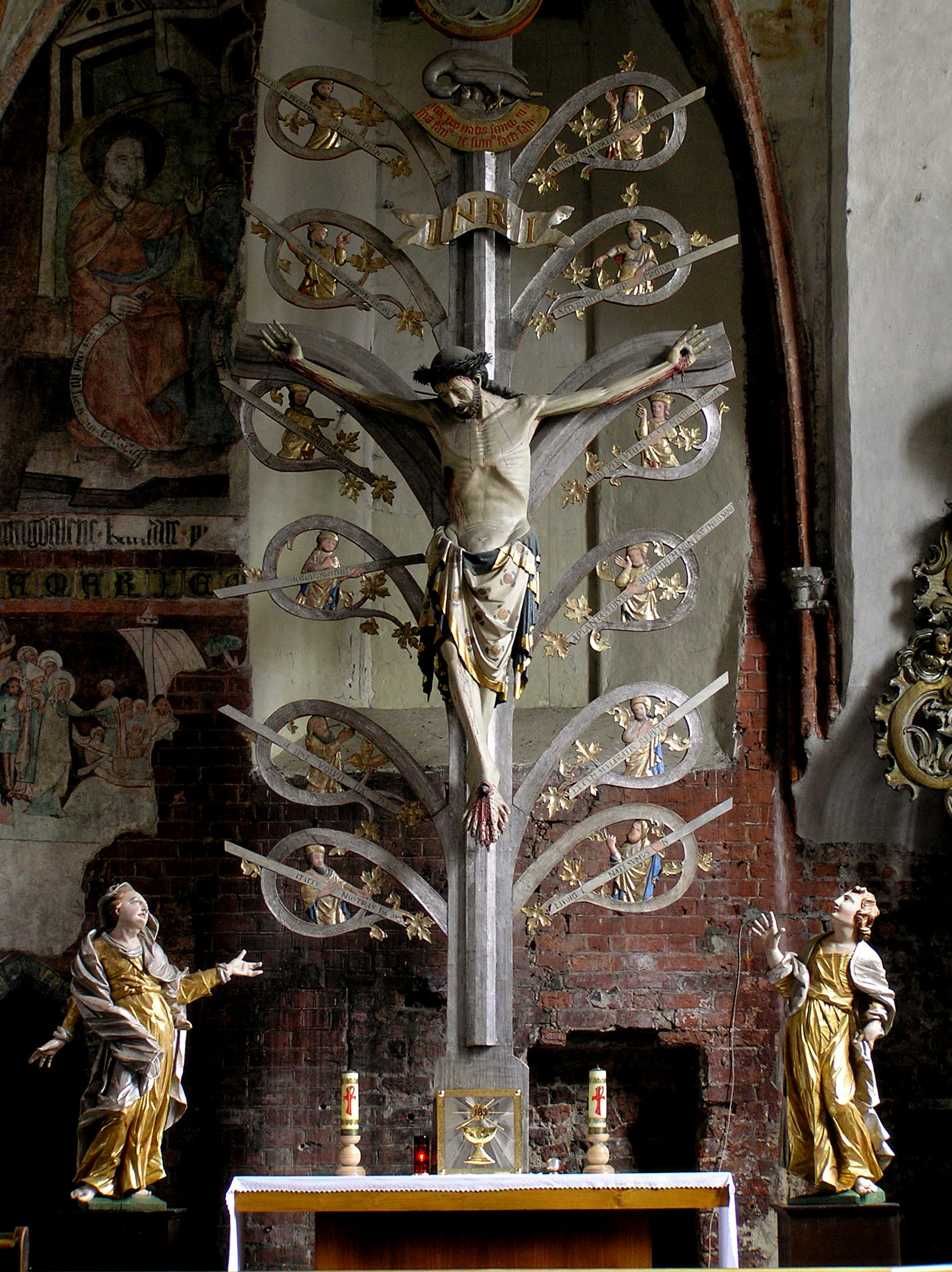
Anonymous, Drzewo Crucifix, polychrome wood and metal, late 14th century, Church of St. James, Toruń, Poland

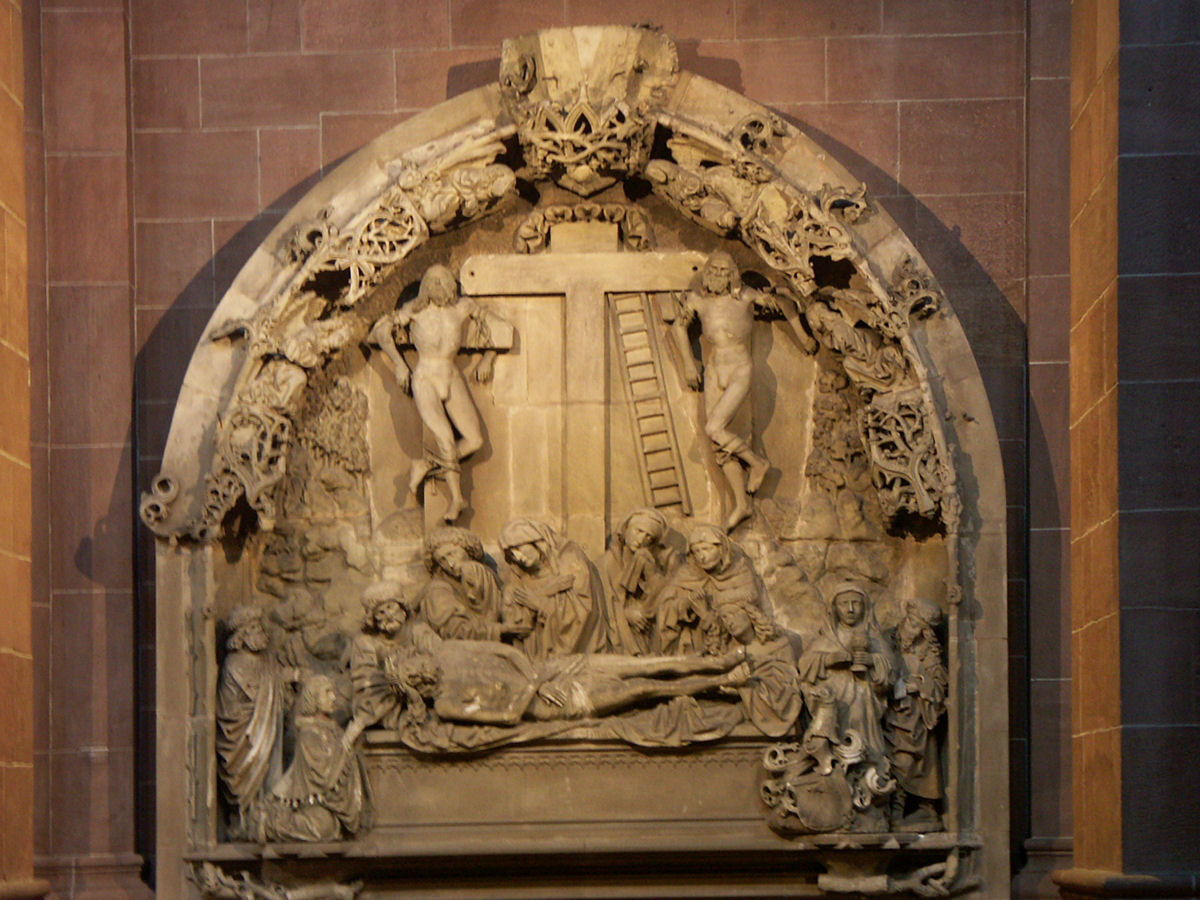
Anonymous, Entombment of Christ, Worms Cathedral

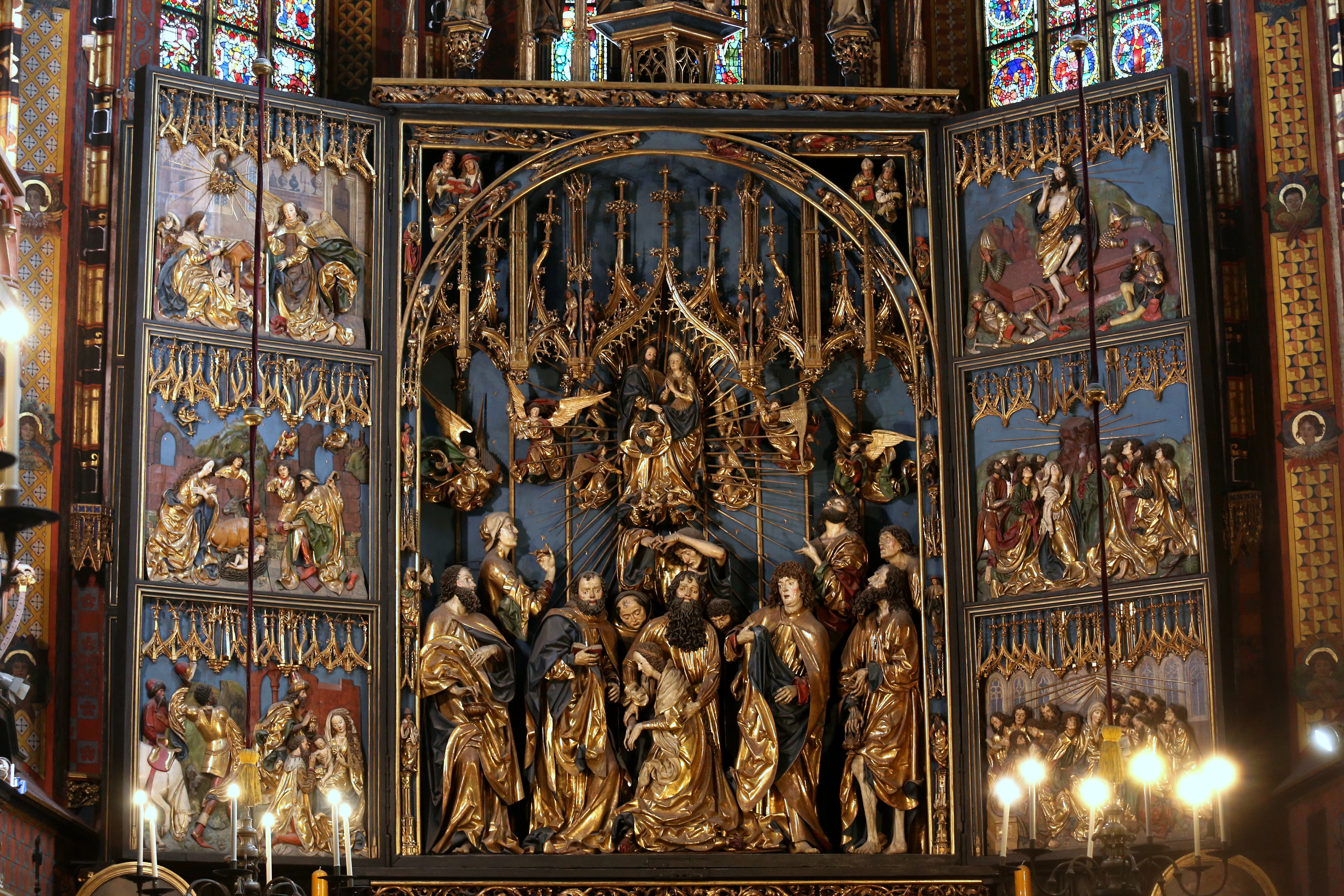
Veit Stoss, Altarpiece in the Church of St. Mary, Kraków, polychrome wood, 1477–1489
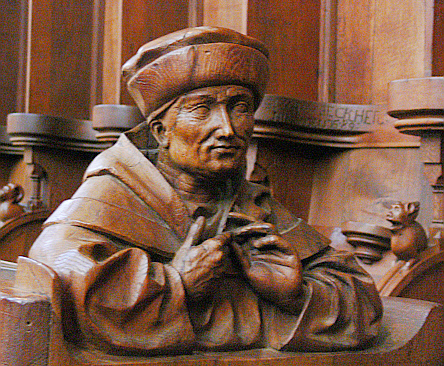
Jörg Syrlin the Younger, Prophet Joshua, 1493, choir stalls of Blaubeuren Monastery

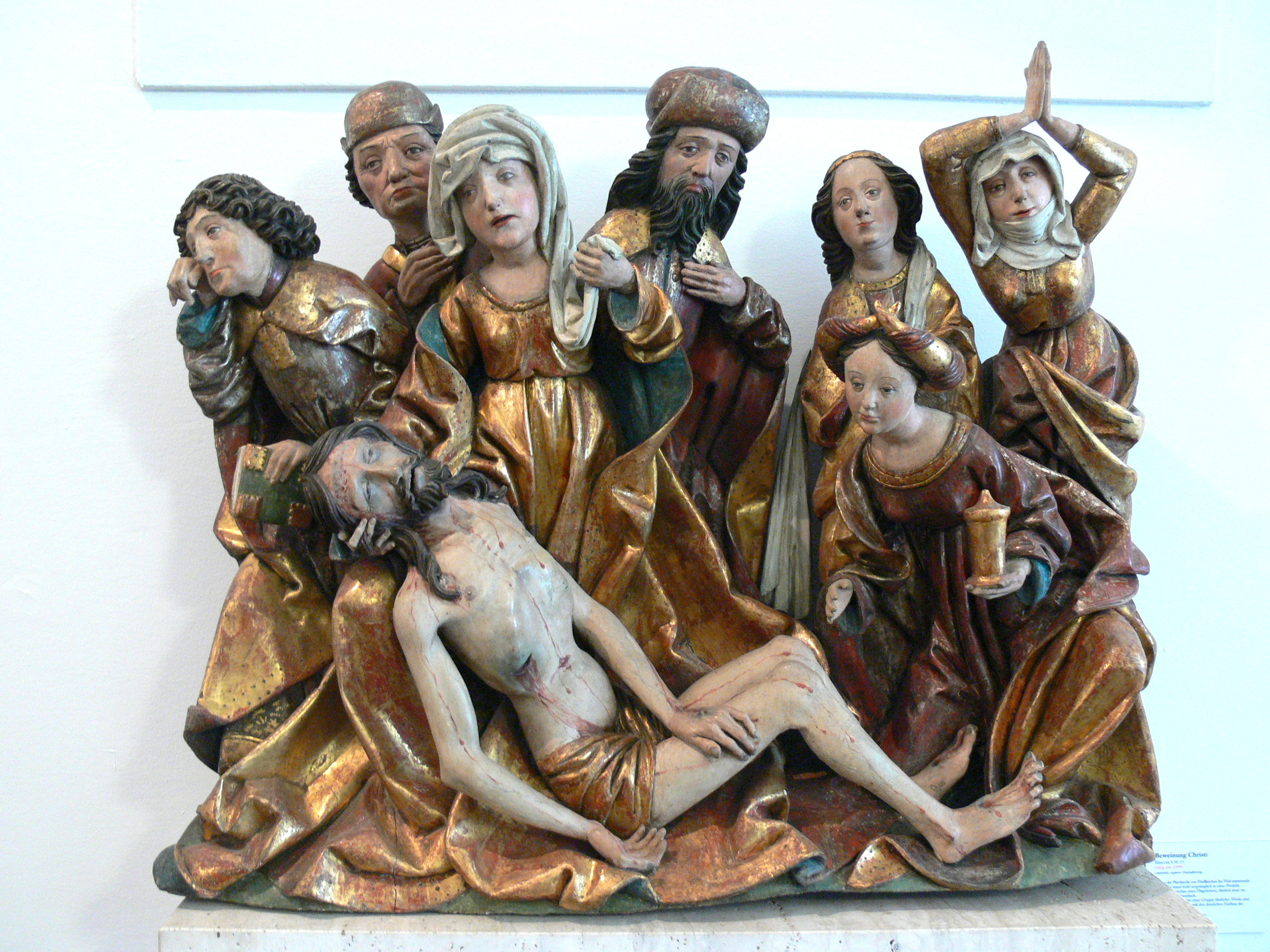
Master S. W., Pietà, polychrome wood, 1499, museum of Linz Castle (Austria)

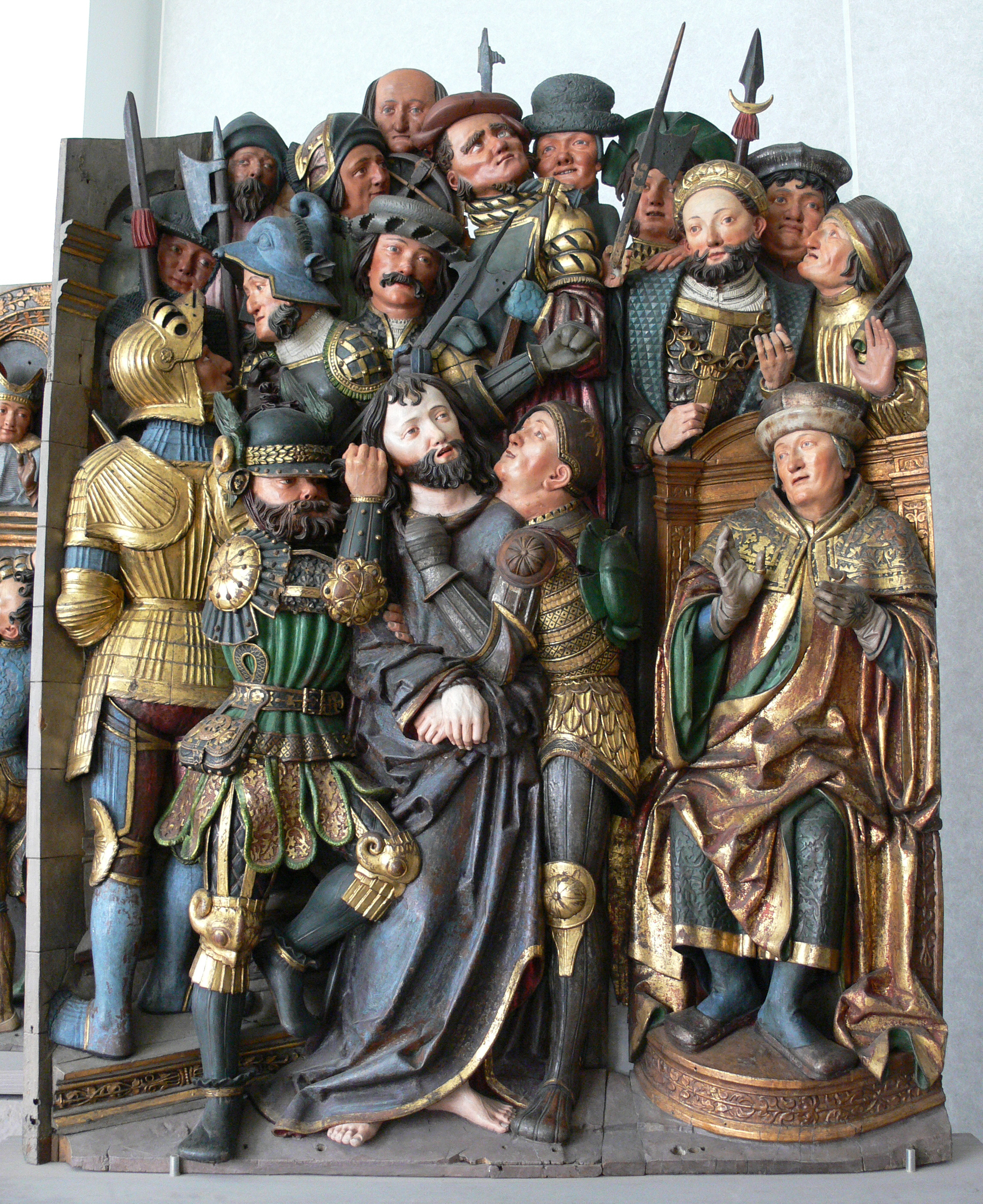
Workshop of Niklaus Weckmann, The Taking of Christ, polychrome wood, 1520

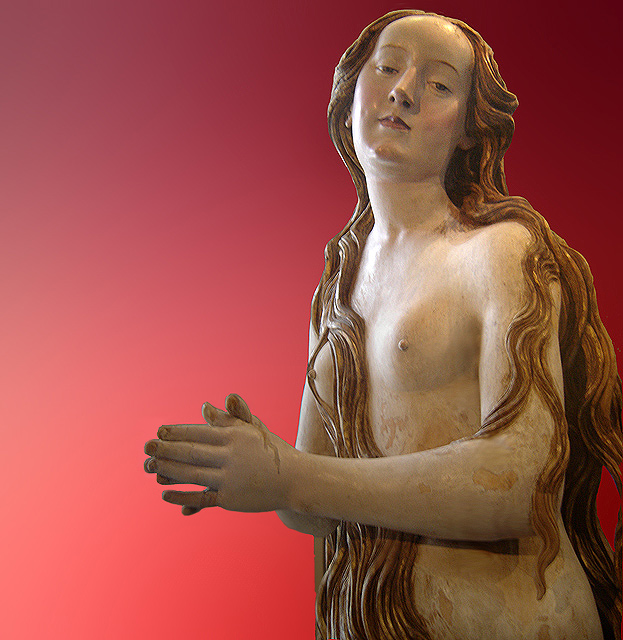
Gregor Erhart: Mary Magdalene, polychrome wood, first half of 16th century

=== England, Scandinavia and the Netherlands ===
In England, the Gothic style emerged a little later than in France, but the concept of the "great portal" never took root as a rule there, and only appears on a few occasions—such as Rochester Cathedral—although even there it is more simplified. Rather, English Gothic sculpture was concentrated in other areas of the building as exemplified in Wells Cathedral, where it appears in niches in the facade and in parts of the interior—such as in the choir and chapter rooms—and its quality compares with French models.

Between the 14th and 15th centuries, facade statuary almost completely disappeared, and in its place, abstract or plant motif decoration was preferred. Several German and Flemish artists were already active there, and interest shifted to other typologies such as the tombs, of which the tomb of Edward II stands out, and several others in Westminster Abbey. Also noticeable in the final stages is a reintegration of sculpture with architecture, again in the interiors, chapels and choir panels, where the statues are framed by rich ornamentation of architectural forms. The chapel of Henry VII at Westminster is the most important example of this genre.

However, the most original achievements of English Gothic sculpture are the tombs. Some of the older ones do not show the dead at rest but as heroes fallen in battle, in contorted positions exhaling his last breath. Others, from the transition between International Gothic and Late Gothic, show them as corpses eaten by worms, with sickening refinements of realism, recalling the ephemerality of worldly things. It seems certain that much devotional statuary was also produced throughout England, with quite unique features and great plastic richness, but the massive destruction that took place when Henry VIII broke with Rome and founded the Church of England hampers the study of its chronology and evolution. Nevertheless, a few surviving pieces exported to Scandinavia suggest that the French influence always remained strong.

In the case of Scandinavia, the Gothic style permeated the country from the 13th century onwards on several fronts—France, England, and Germany—and the sculpture produced there showed great variety and vitality in various regional schools. There are beautiful works in elephant and walrus ivory, and wood was the material where the most interesting pieces were left, such as the monumental crucifixes found in Gotland and other cities. In any case, several cathedrals with significant statuary decoration were built, such as those in Uppsala, Skara, and Trondheim. Between the 14th and 15th centuries, trade intensified with the members of the Hanseatic League, and at this stage Scandinavian sculpture was dominated by the influence of the Lubeque school.

It seems that in the early stages of the Gothic period there was little significance in sculpture in the Netherlands, and whatever there was must have been French and Rhenish derivation.

The Reformation did massive damage there, and during World War I many monuments also disappeared so little is known. However, it is certain that by the 14th century, an important school had been established in Tournai, and the impact of the Flemish masters was felt in the sculpture of England, France, and Germany, making this period somewhat less obscure.

The Tournai school left its best representation in tombs, with an aesthetic that was both austere and naturalistic. In the 15th century, the Flemish finally became a major influence on all European art, with artists such as Claus Sluter, Jean de Liège, Jacques de Baerze, and many others, who spread their art to other regions. This great group of creators worked a little in stone but left their most important works in the genre of the polychrome wooden retable, and with a figuration tending toward the dramatic and the dynamic.

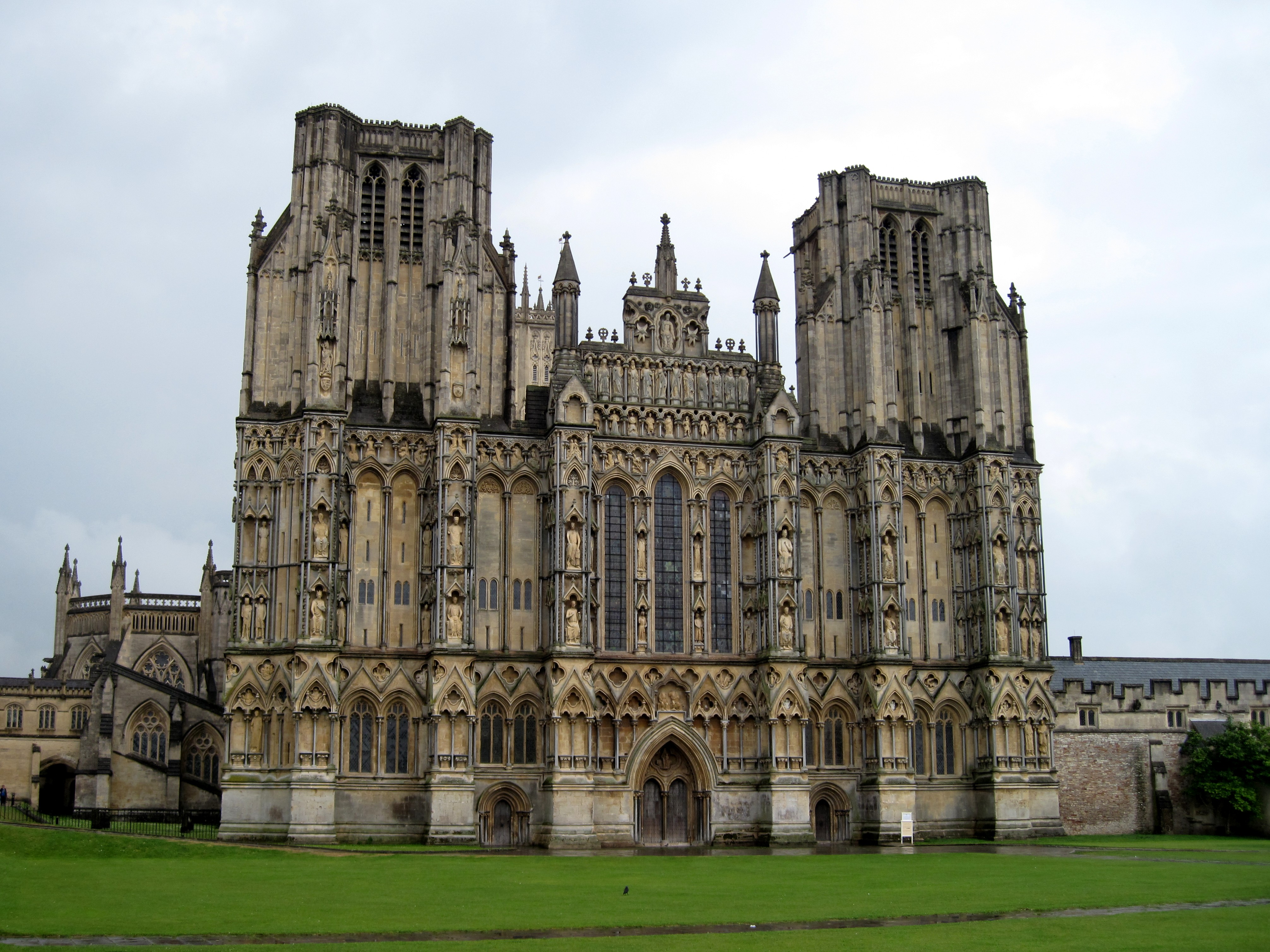
Wells Cathedral, England, 1250

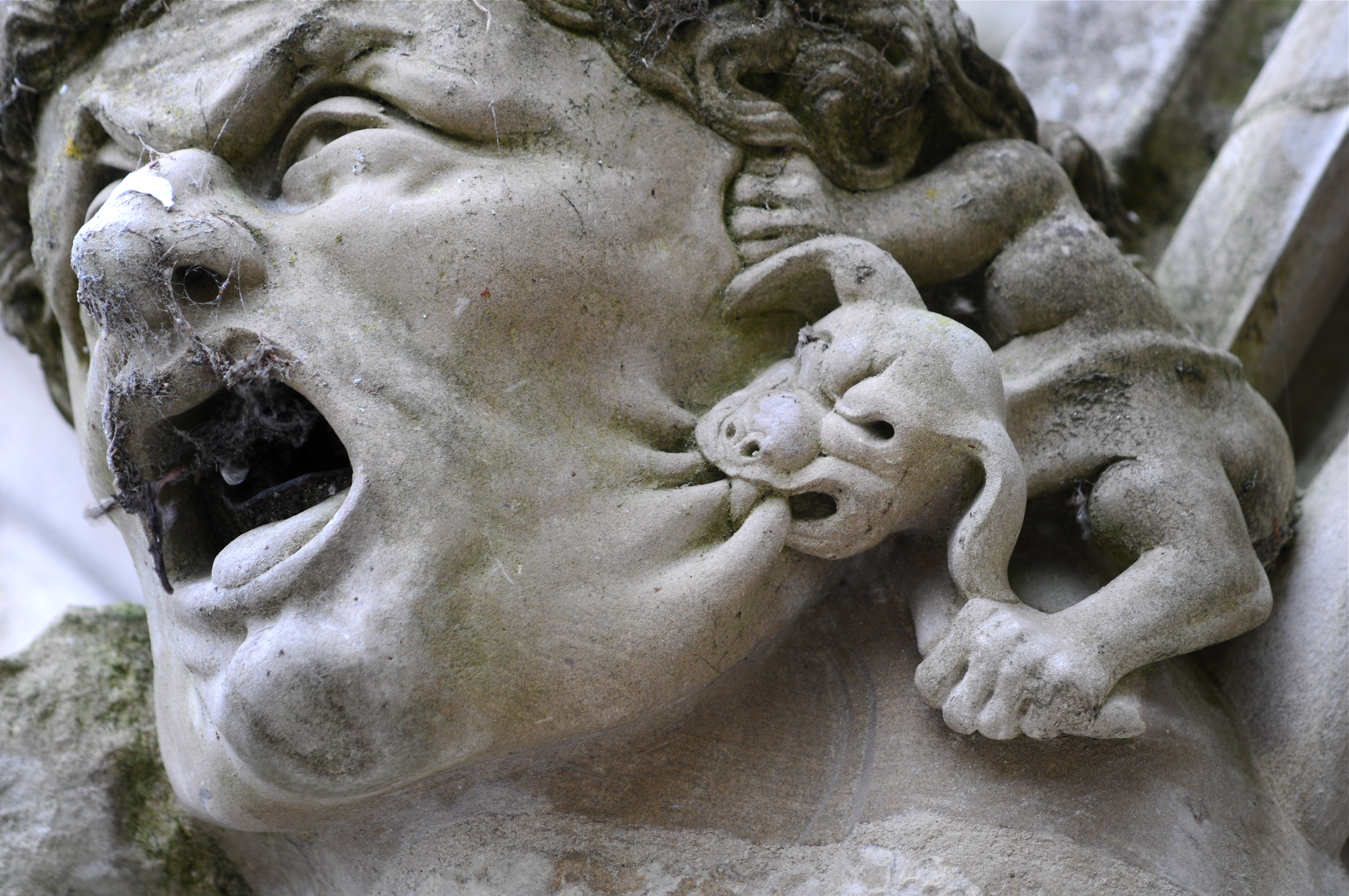
Gargoyle, Lincoln Cathedral, England, between 1185 and 1311

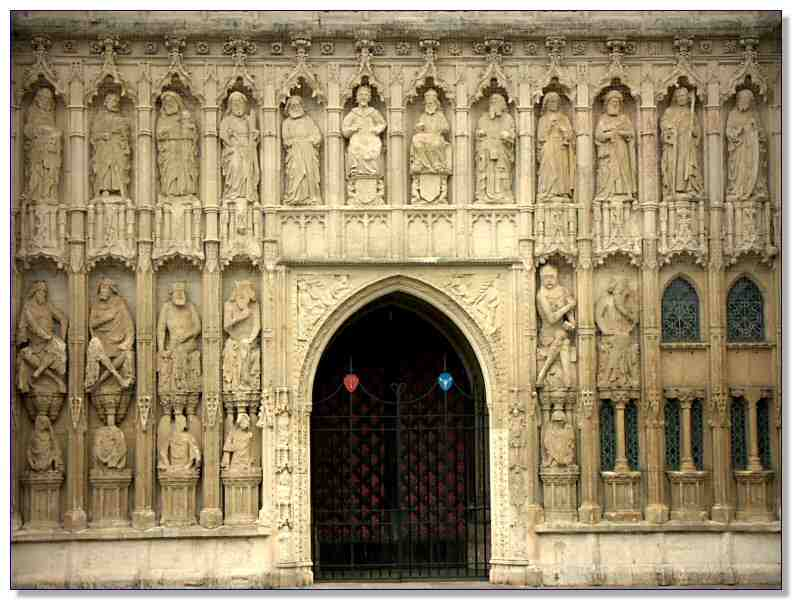
Detail of the facade of Exeter Cathedral, England, 1258–1400

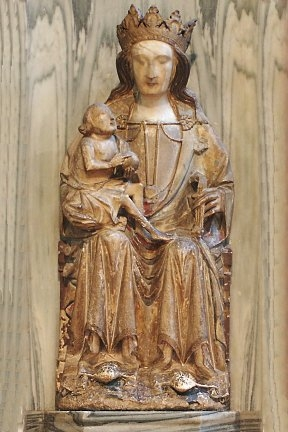
Anonymous, Our Lady of Westminster, alabaster, 1450, Westminster Abbey, London, England
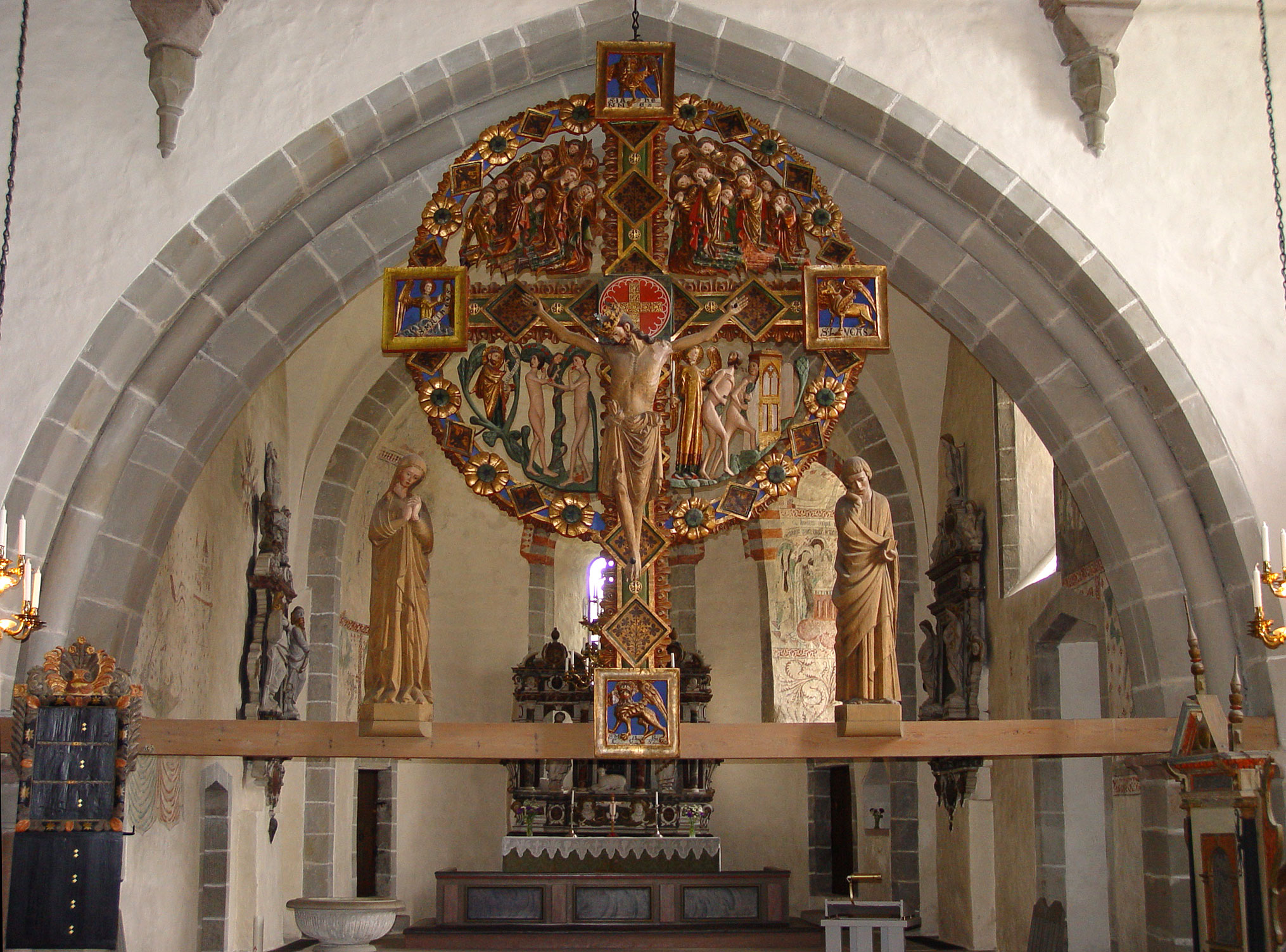
Anonymous, The Triumphal Cross, polychrome wood, 1275–1290, Öja Church, Gotland, Sweden

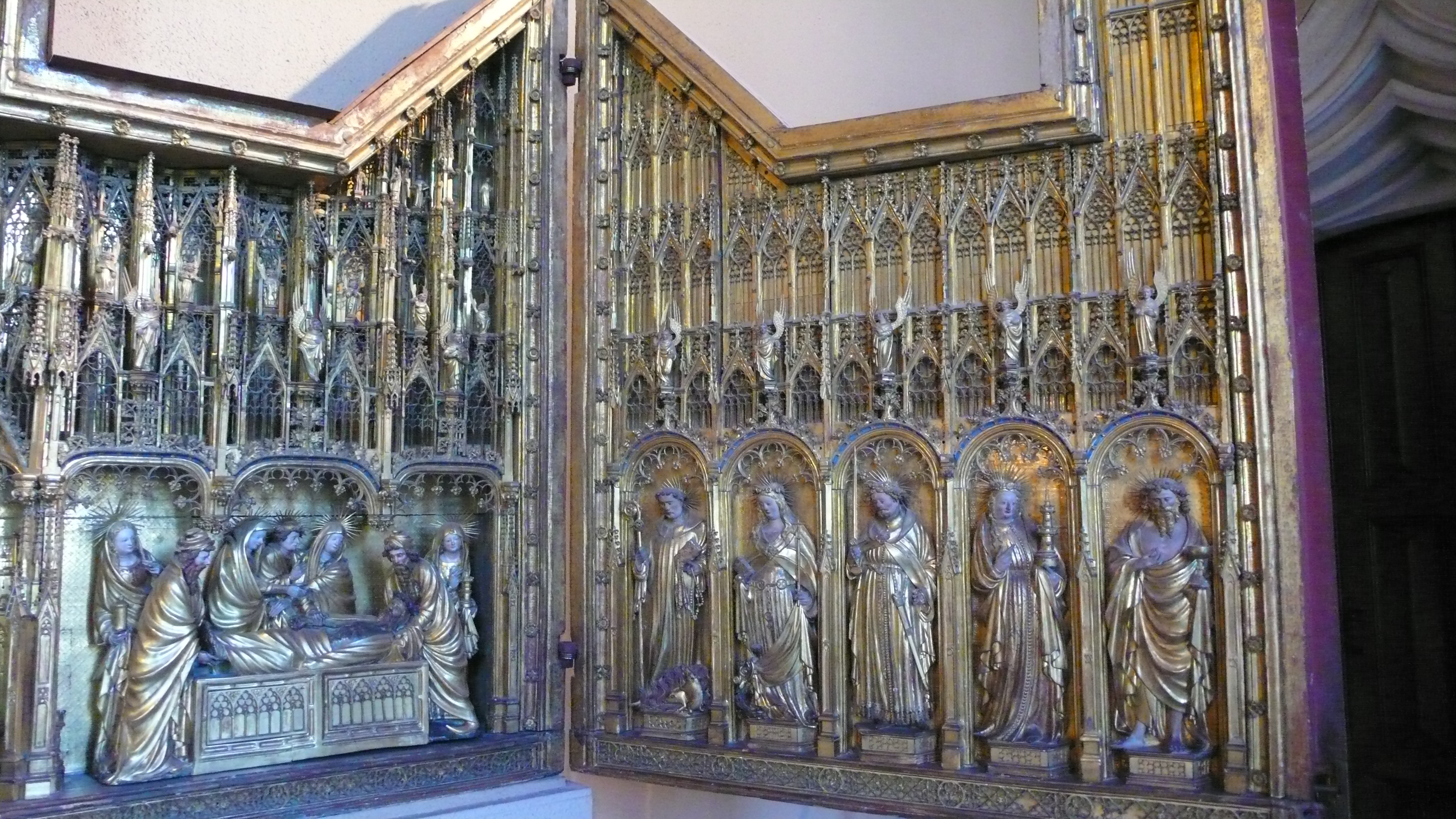
Jacques de Baerze, Retable of the Crucifixion (detail), polychrome wood, 1390, Dijon, France

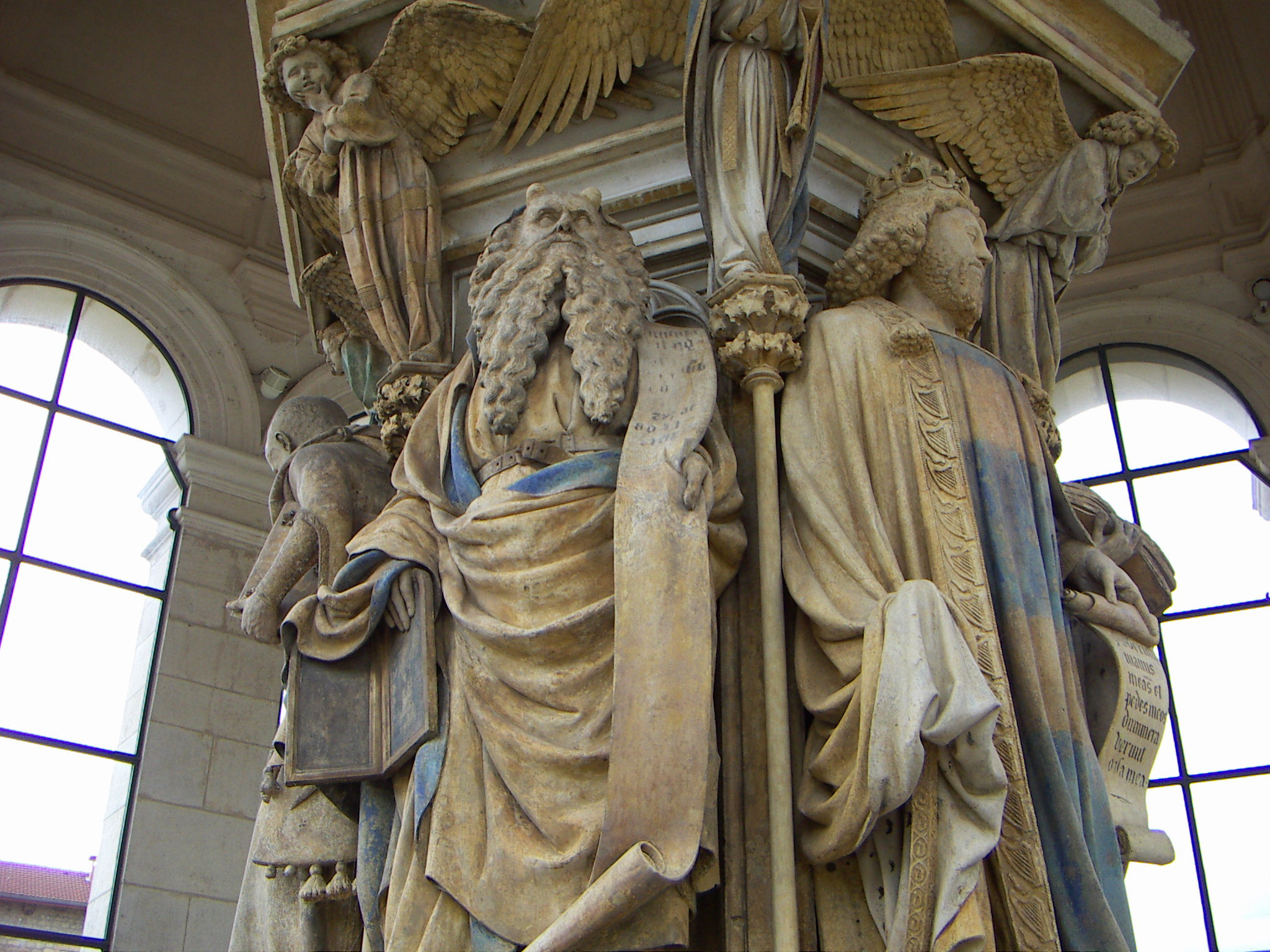
Claus Sluter, Well of Moses (detail), polychrome stone, 1395–1403, Dijon, France

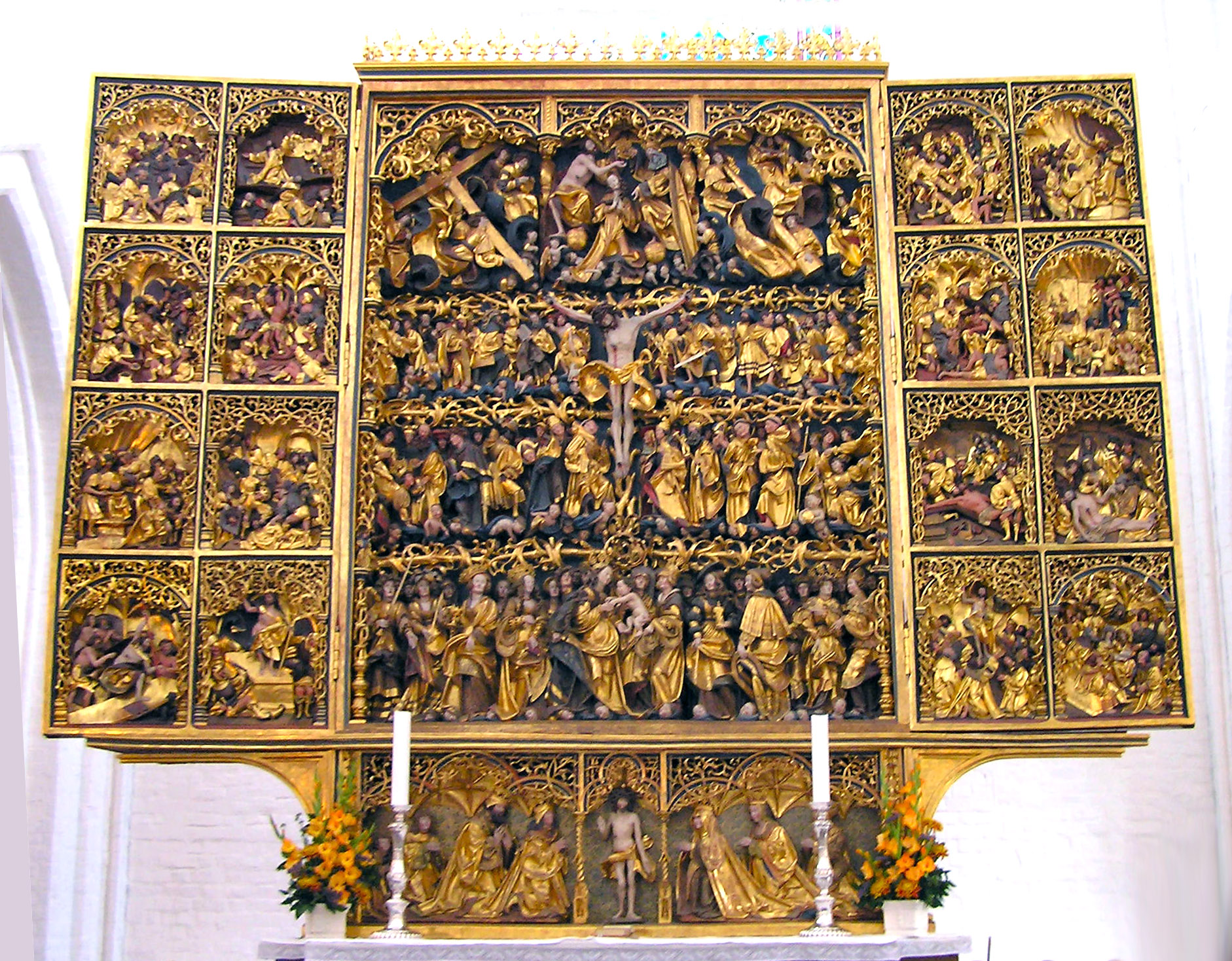
Claus Berg, Passion altarpiece, Polychrome wood, 1515–1525, Odense Cathedral, Denmark

=== Iberian Peninsula ===
In Spain, the transition from the Romanesque to the Gothic appeared in the Portico of Glory of Santiago de Compostela Cathedral, which is particularly interesting because it still preserves traces of its polychromy. Throughout the early evolution of the Spanish Gothic, the French influence remained predominant and although in general less rich than in France, it acquired a very original feature, visible in the assimilation of Moorish influences, in a recurrent tendency to archaism, and in the taste for luxuriant floral ornamentation.

Significant examples of a full Gothic style are in the León Cathedral and the Burgos Cathedral, which were on the pilgrimage routes of the time and were decorated with important statuary. Throughout the 13th century, the rest of the Spanish regions remained more or less oblivious to the Gothic style, and churches continued to be built in the Romanesque fashion. Meanwhile, the import of small French Gothic pieces for private devotion was large, and several French artists worked on this genre in many locations.

Finally, in the 14th century, the French style triumphed in most regions, with the exception of Galicia and Extremadura, and the main centres of monumental sculpture became Navarre, Catalonia, and Aragon. Good examples of this phase are Barcelona Cathedral and Cathedral-Basilica of Our Lady of the Pillar, and at the same time, sculpture came to be applied in a variety of other spaces, such as tombs, chapter halls, and choirs.

From the 15th century onward, French influence gave way to Flemish and German influence, which would predominate until the infusion of Renaissance classicism in the reign of Charles V in the 16th century. At this stage, interest in monumental decoration declined, as elsewhere in Europe, and shifted to portable works and retables. The last great examples of facade statuary in a pure Gothic style are in Oviedo Cathedral, Seville Cathedral, and parts of the still incomplete Toledo Cathedral.

By the transition to the 16th century, Italian classical elements were already widespread, giving birth to an eclectic Mannerist school called plateresque, which developed a style of facade decoration with statuary framed by an enormous complexity of geometric and vegetal motifs. The same plateresque applied to the retables, whose sophistication and richness surpass those of northern Europe of the same phase but whose appearance is clearly distinctive. One of the most notable makers of retables was Gil de Siloé, and a great representative of independent statuary was Juan de Juni.

Portugal had its cycle beginning around year 1250, but sculpture was never especially favoured. Its main examples are some tombs of the nobility, highlighting the sophisticated tombs of Peter I and Inês de Castro in the Alcobaça Monastery. The largest centers of production were Coimbra, Lisbon, Santarém and Évora.

Between the end of the 15th century and the start of the 16th, the Manueline Style—a mannerist derivation of the Gothic that incorporated classical elements—flourished. Its main monument is the Jerónimos Monastery in Lisbon, with a portal designed by João de Castilho, richly decorated with statuary and various ornaments.

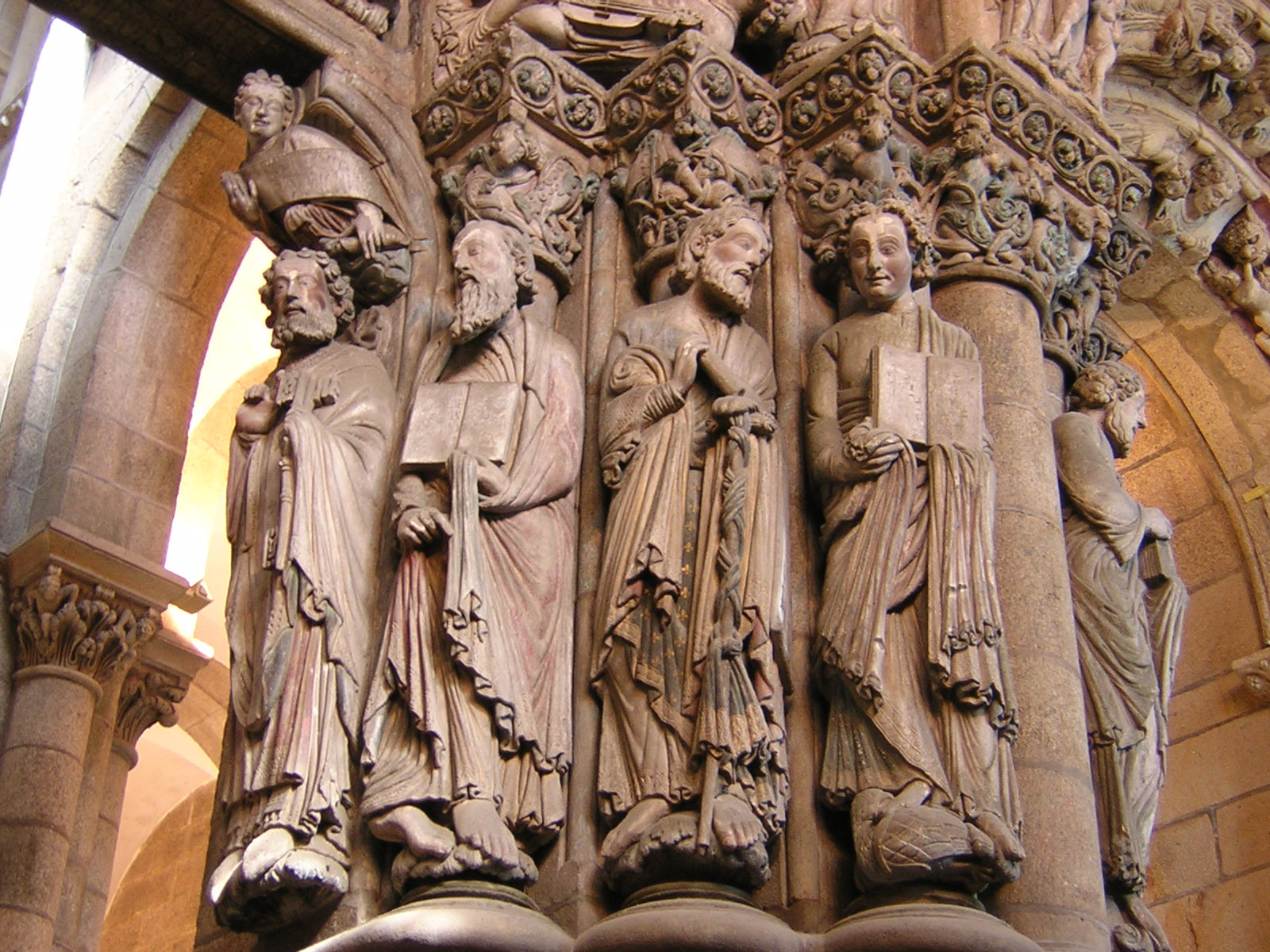
Apostles of the jambs of the Pórtico da Gloria, 13th century, Santiago de Compostela Cathedral

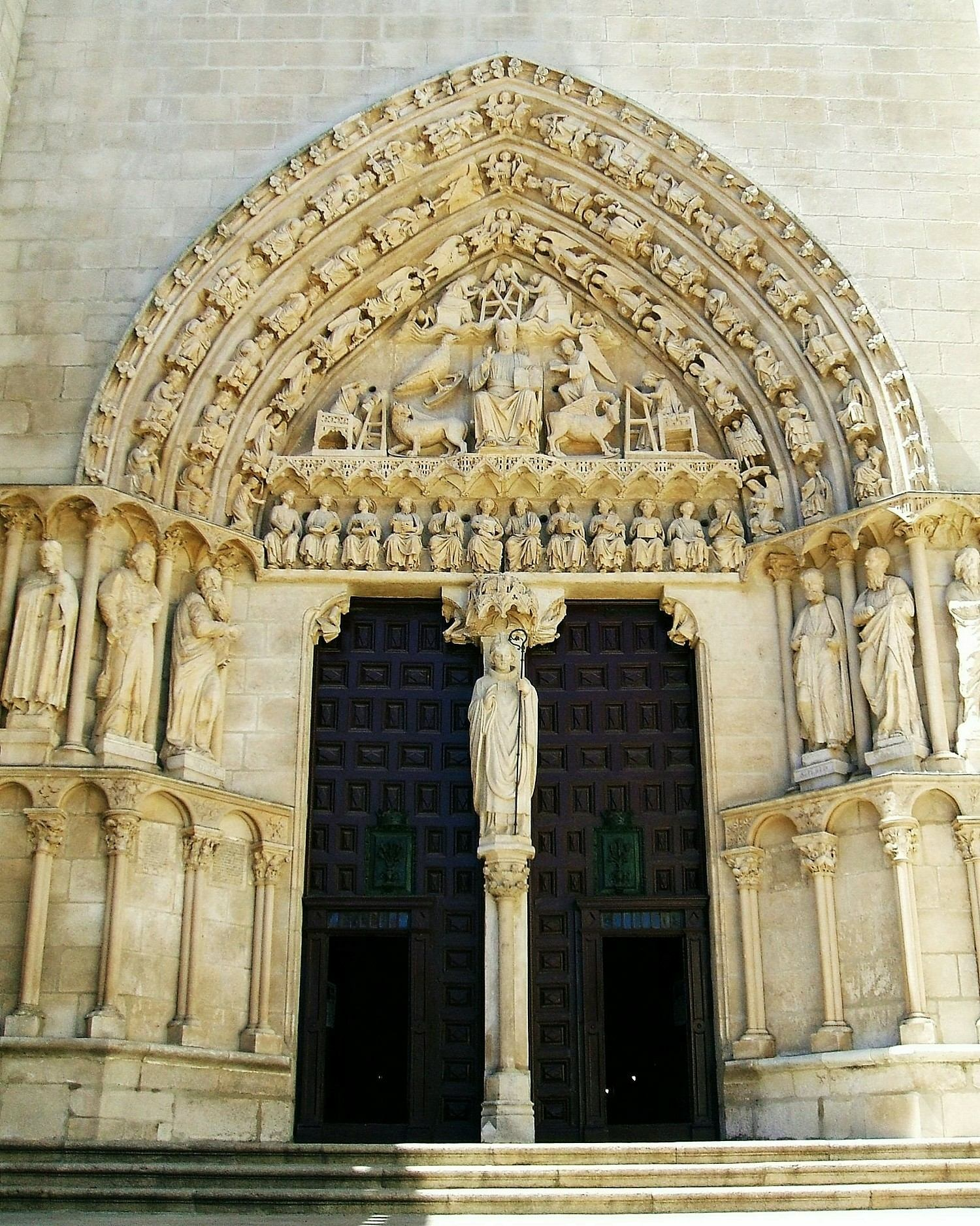
Door of Sarmental of Burgos Cathedral, Spain, 13th century

Anonymous, Tomb of Inês de Castro, marble, 1358–1367, Alcobaça, Portugal

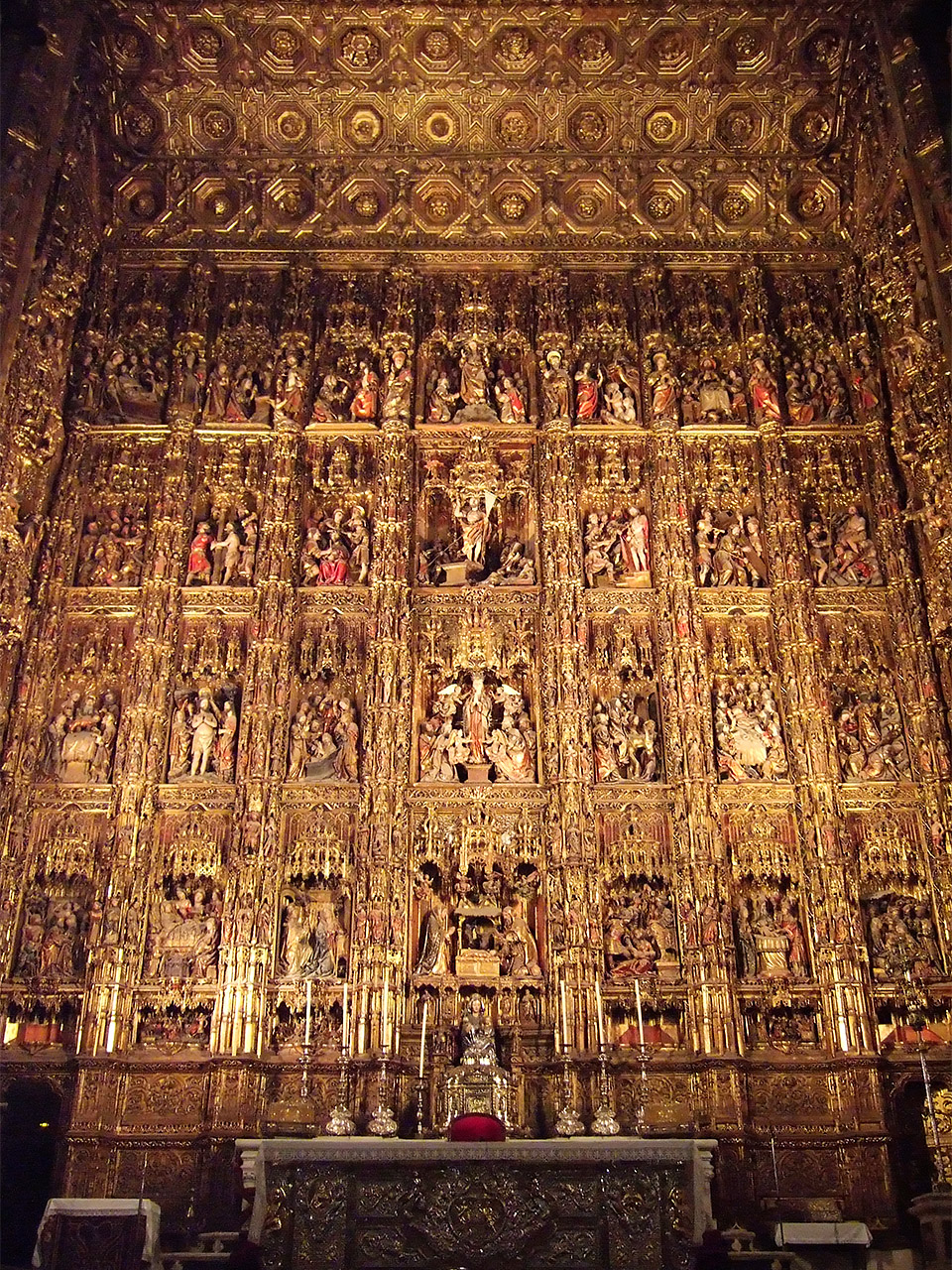
Pierre Dancart, Altarpiece, polychrome wood, 1480, Seville Cathedral, Spain
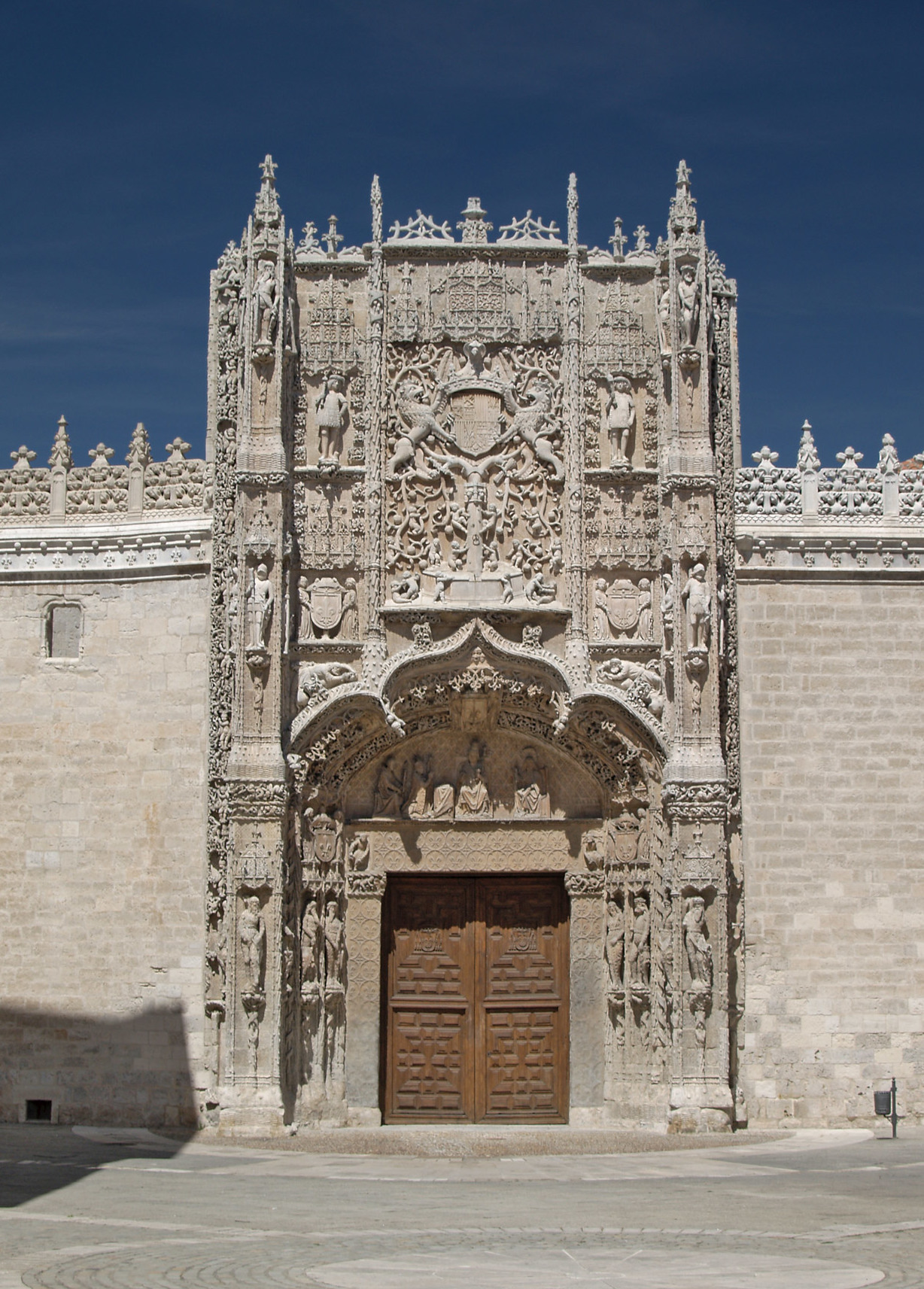
Facade of Colegio de San Gregorio, before 1492, Valladolid, Spain

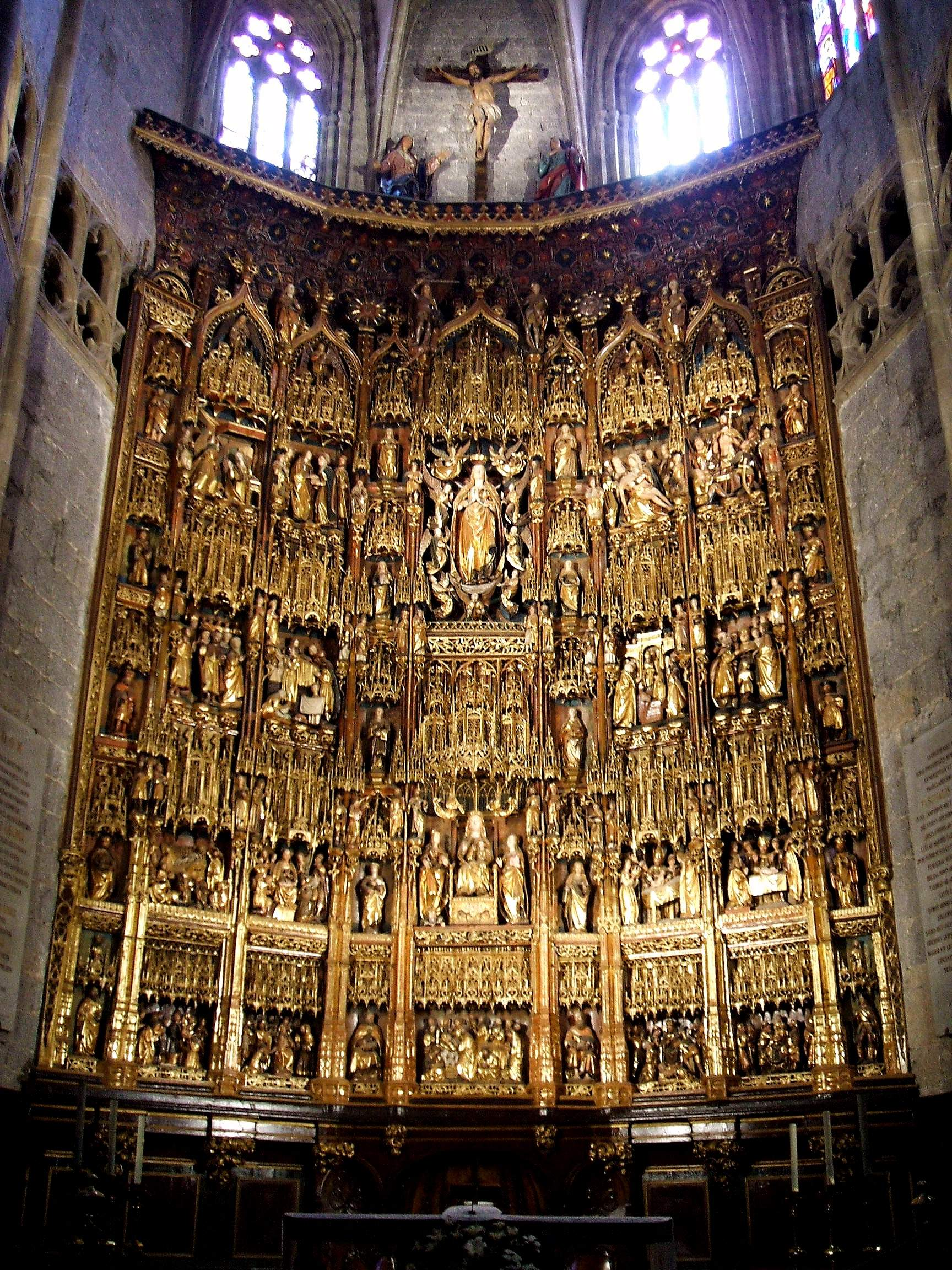
Altarpiece of the Passion, Spanish-Flemish, polychrome wood, 1495–1500, Basilica of the Assumption of Our Lady of Lequeitio, Biscay, Spain

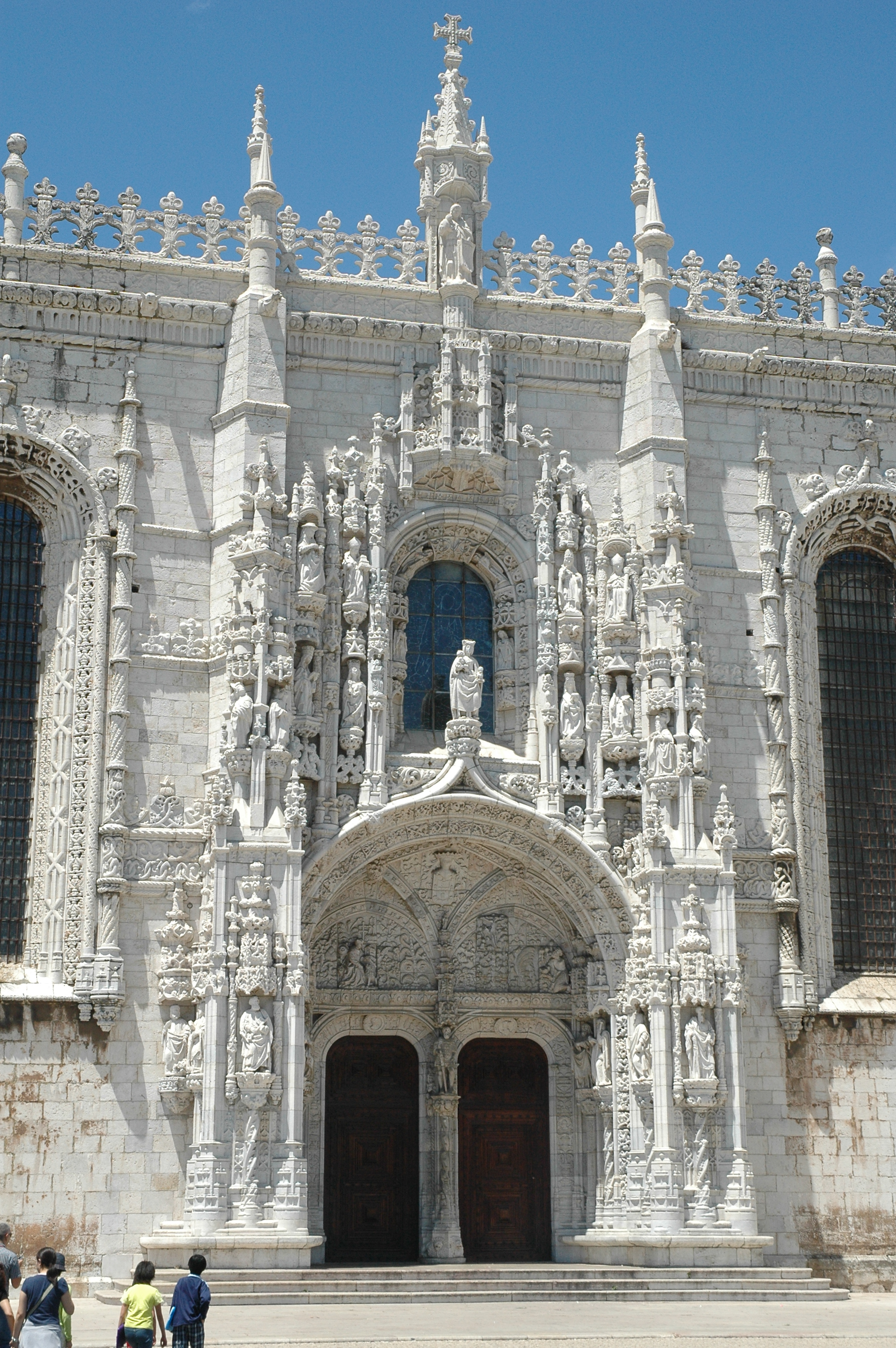
João de Castilho, south portal of the Jerónimos Monastery, 1502–1517, Lisbon, Portugal

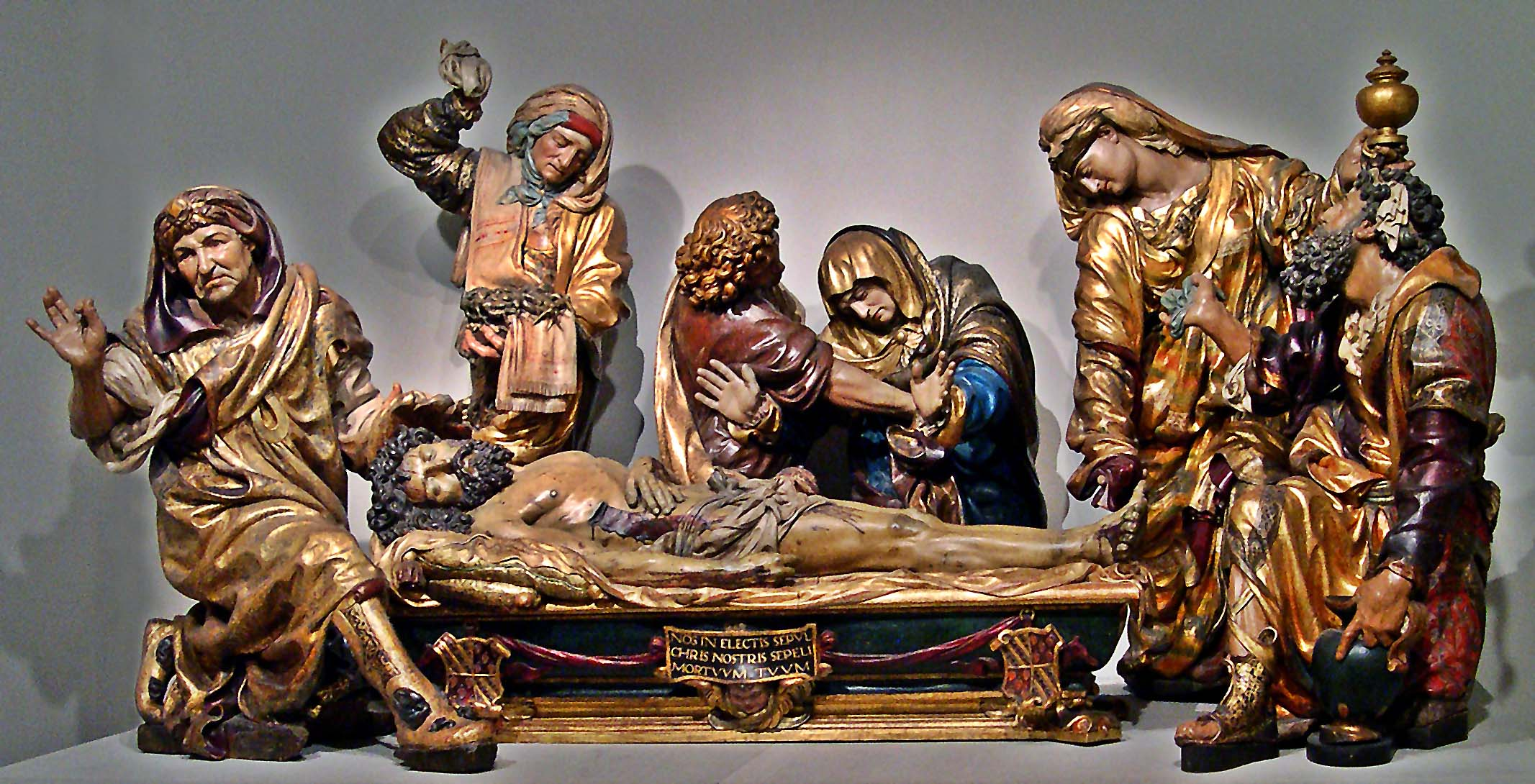
Juan de Juni, The Holy Burial, polychrome wood, mid-16th century, National Museum of Sculpture, Valladolid, Spain

=== Italy ===
The development of Italian Gothic is possibly the most atypical of them all. The classical tradition had always remained relatively alive there, through the many ruins with reliefs, sarcophagi, and tombstones that had been preserved from the ancient Roman Empire, and its principles are visible from the beginning of the Gothic tradition. They also accounted for its briefest manifestation.

In Italy, the tradition of large portals was not significantly developed, there being a greater number of works in niches, tombs and funeral monuments, pulpits and reliefs. The style first appeared in the central region, in the early 13th century, with the work of Nicola Pisano and his son Giovanni Pisano, who left works of great quality in Pisa and Siena that were possibly inspired by the figures of the Roman sarcophagi that existed in the Camposanto of Pisa. Their treatment of the human figure is quite classicizing, but the costumes are drawn up more according to the French pattern and the emphasis is on the drama of the scenes.

The style of both was of great influence to the following generations, especially on Arnolfo di Cambio, Andrea Orcagna, Bonino da Campione, Tino di Camaino, Lorenzo Maitani and Giovanni di Balduccio, who took it to other areas such as Milan and Naples and introduced individualized interpretations. Another important master was Andrea Pisano, author of the first bronze door of Florence Baptistery.

By the early 14th century, classical elements were already predominant, and the Renaissance cycle was beginning, but Gothic influences can still be detected in sculptures by Lorenzo Ghiberti and Donatello, and also in several minor artists active in the peripheries between the 14th and 15th centuries.

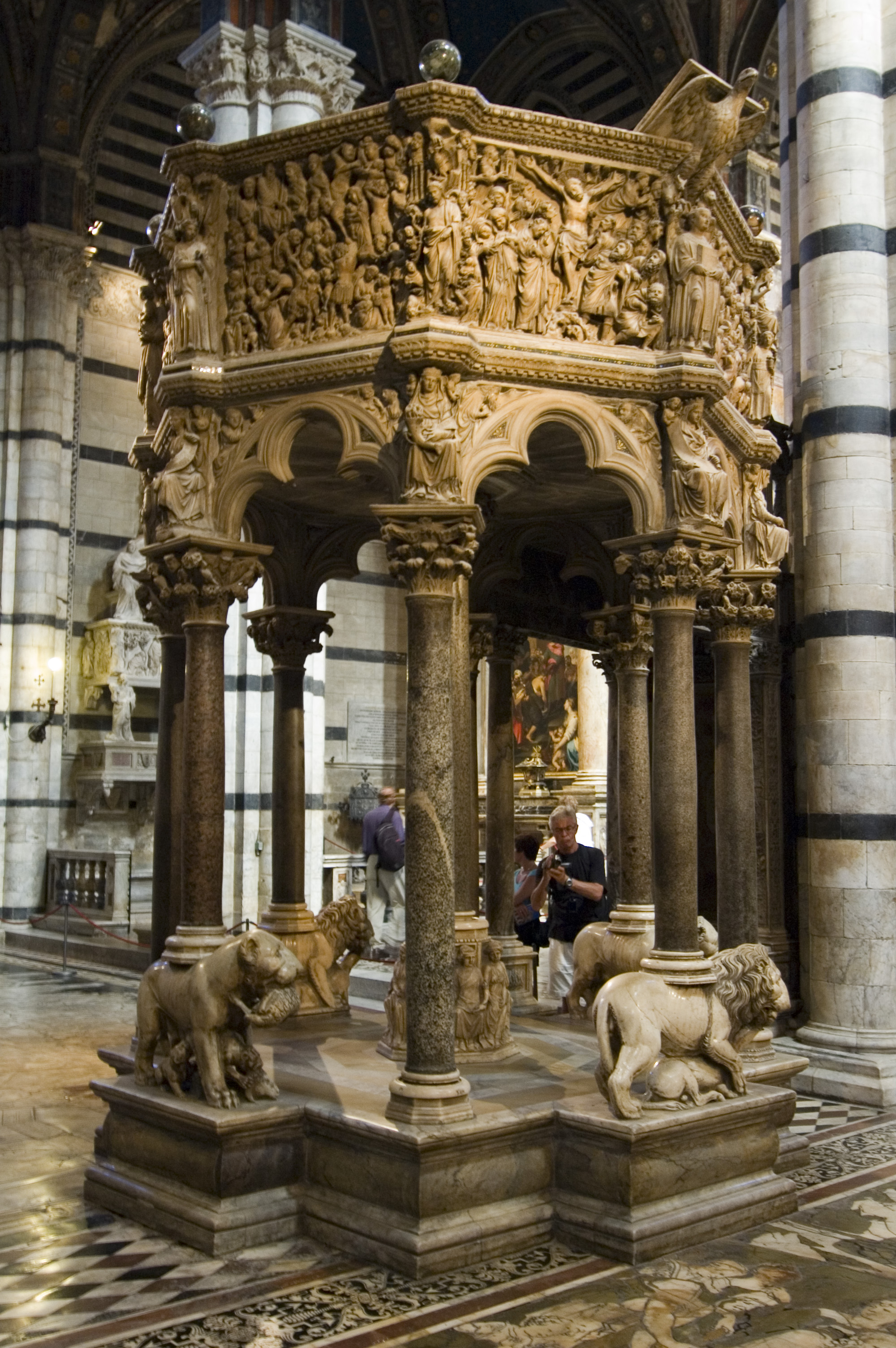
Nicola Pisano, Siena Cathedral Pulpit, marble, 1265–1268

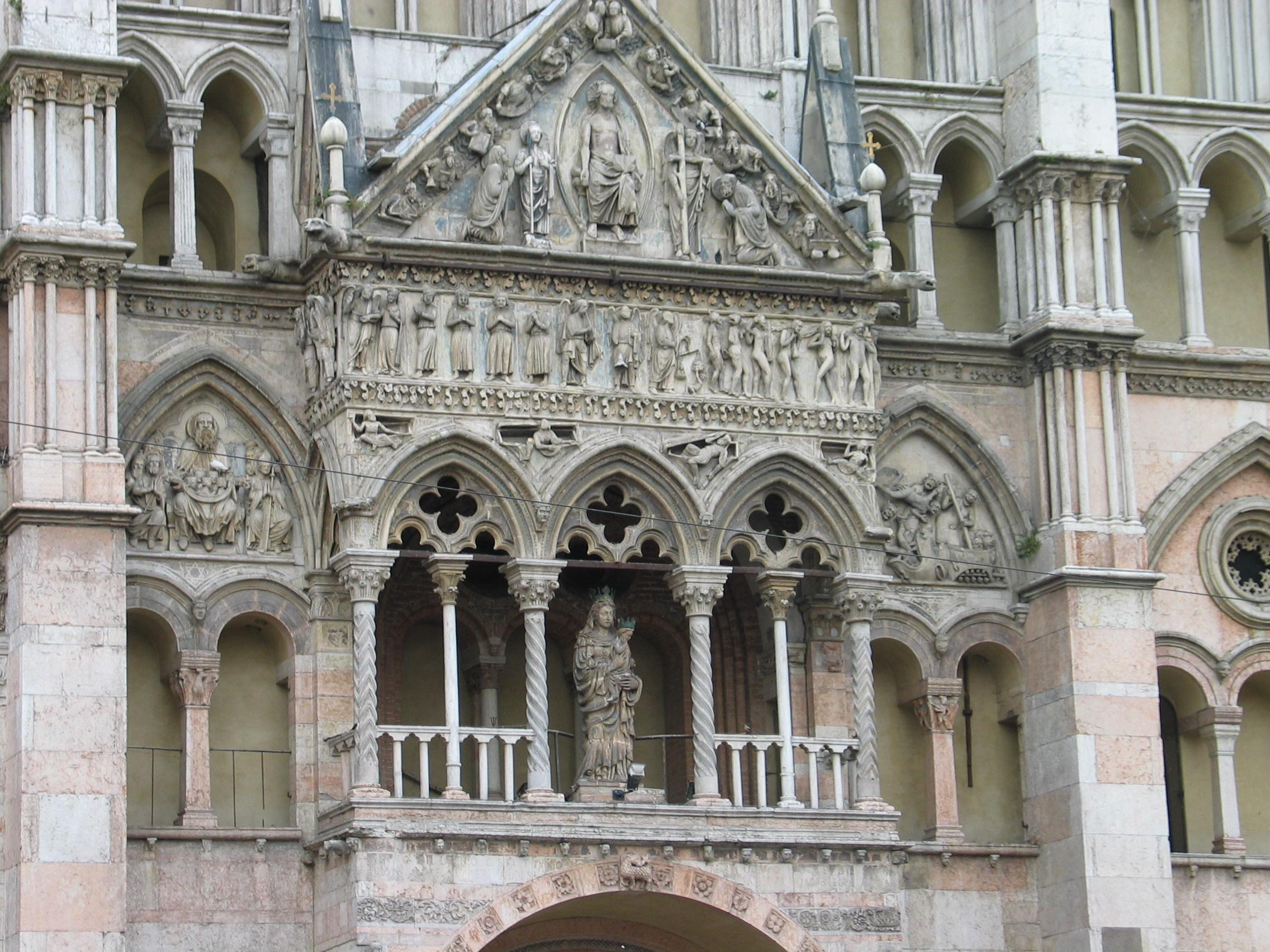
Frontispiece of Ferrara Cathedral, 1300

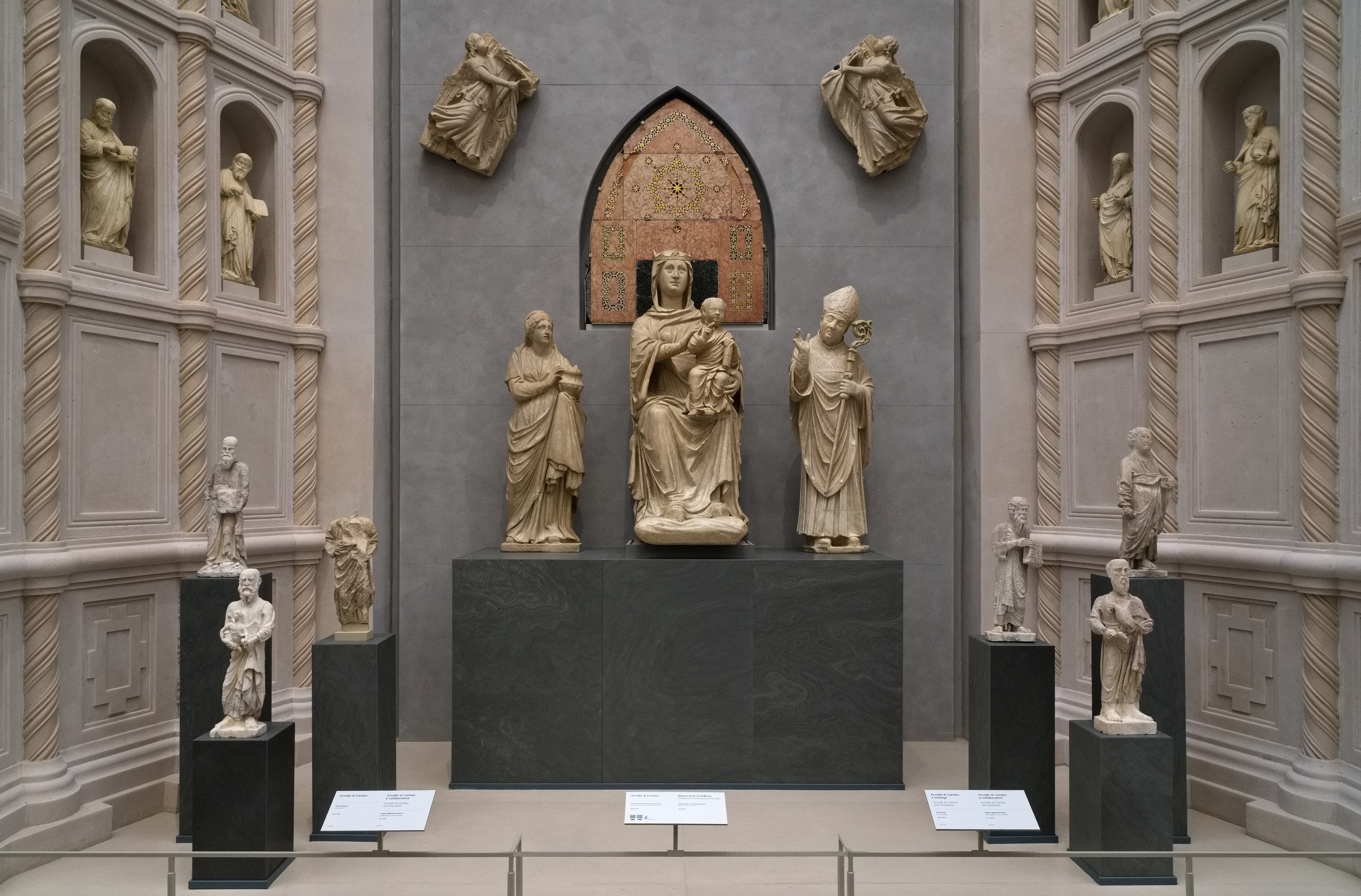
Arnolfo di Cambio, sculptures from the first facade of Florence Cathedral, marble, 1300–1310, Museo dell'Opera del Duomo, Florence

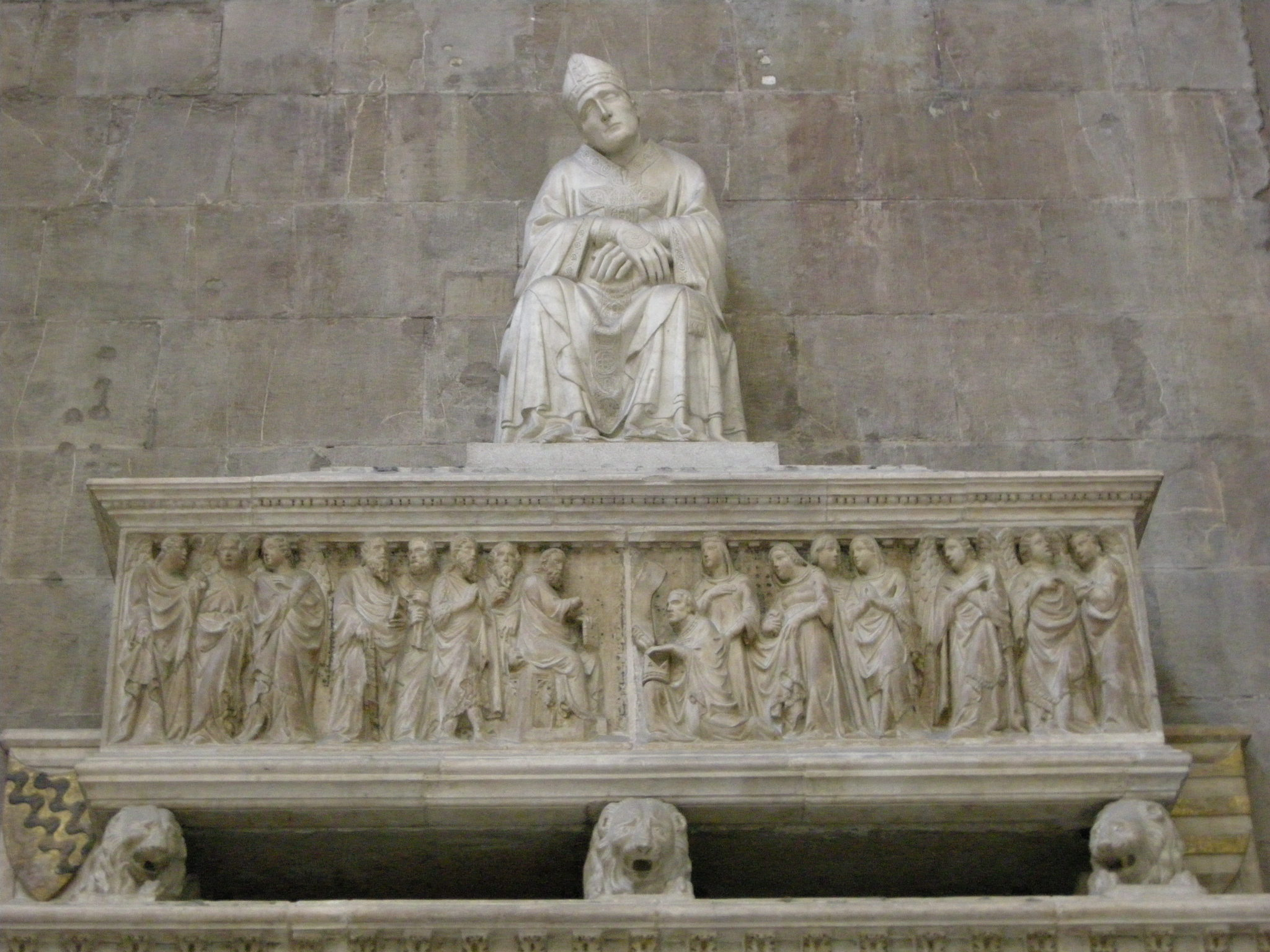
Tino di Camaino, Monumental Tomb of Antonio d'Orso (fragment), marble, 1323, Florence Cathedral
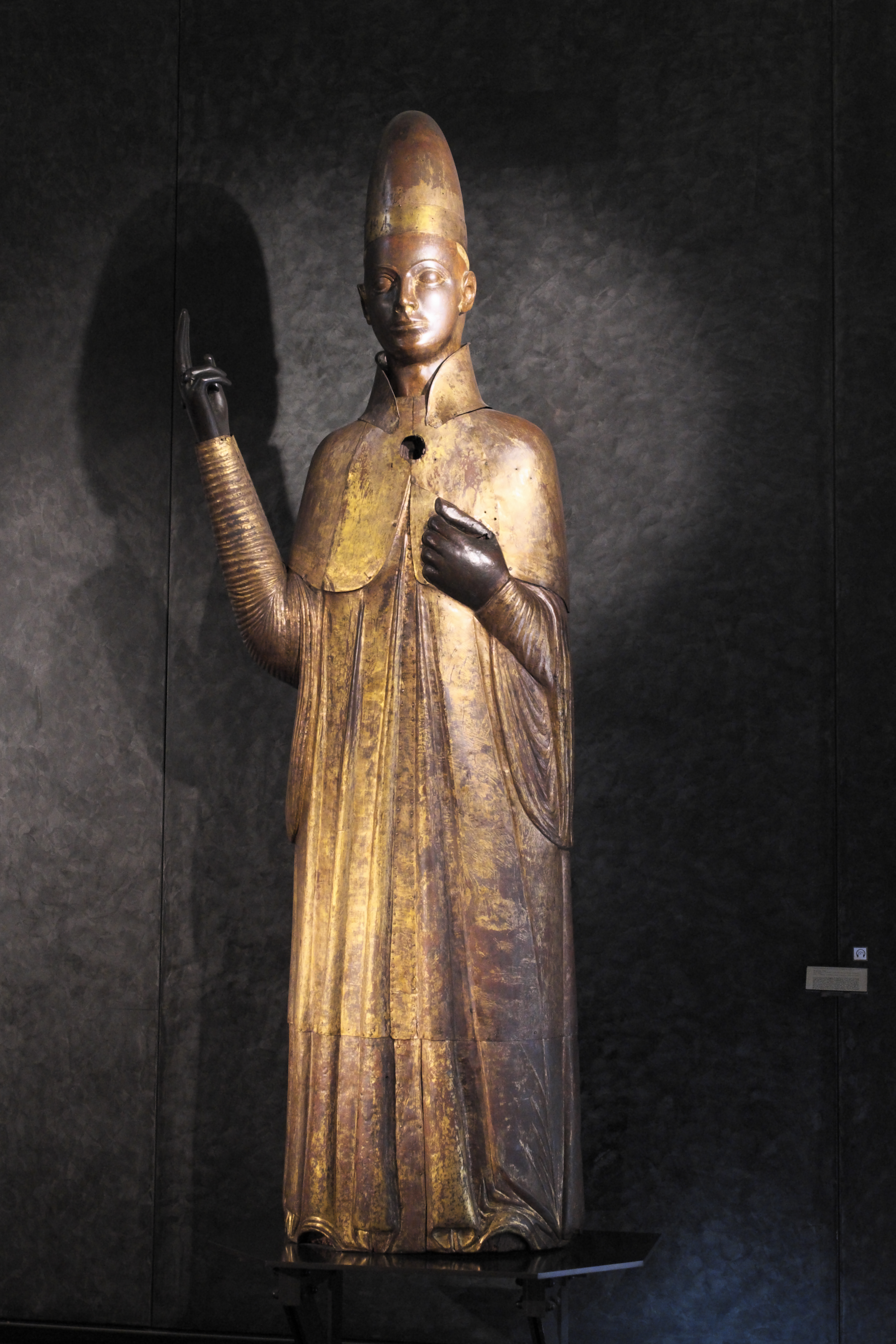
Manno Bandini da Siena, Boniface VIII, bronze and wood, early 14th ct., Museo Civico, Bologna

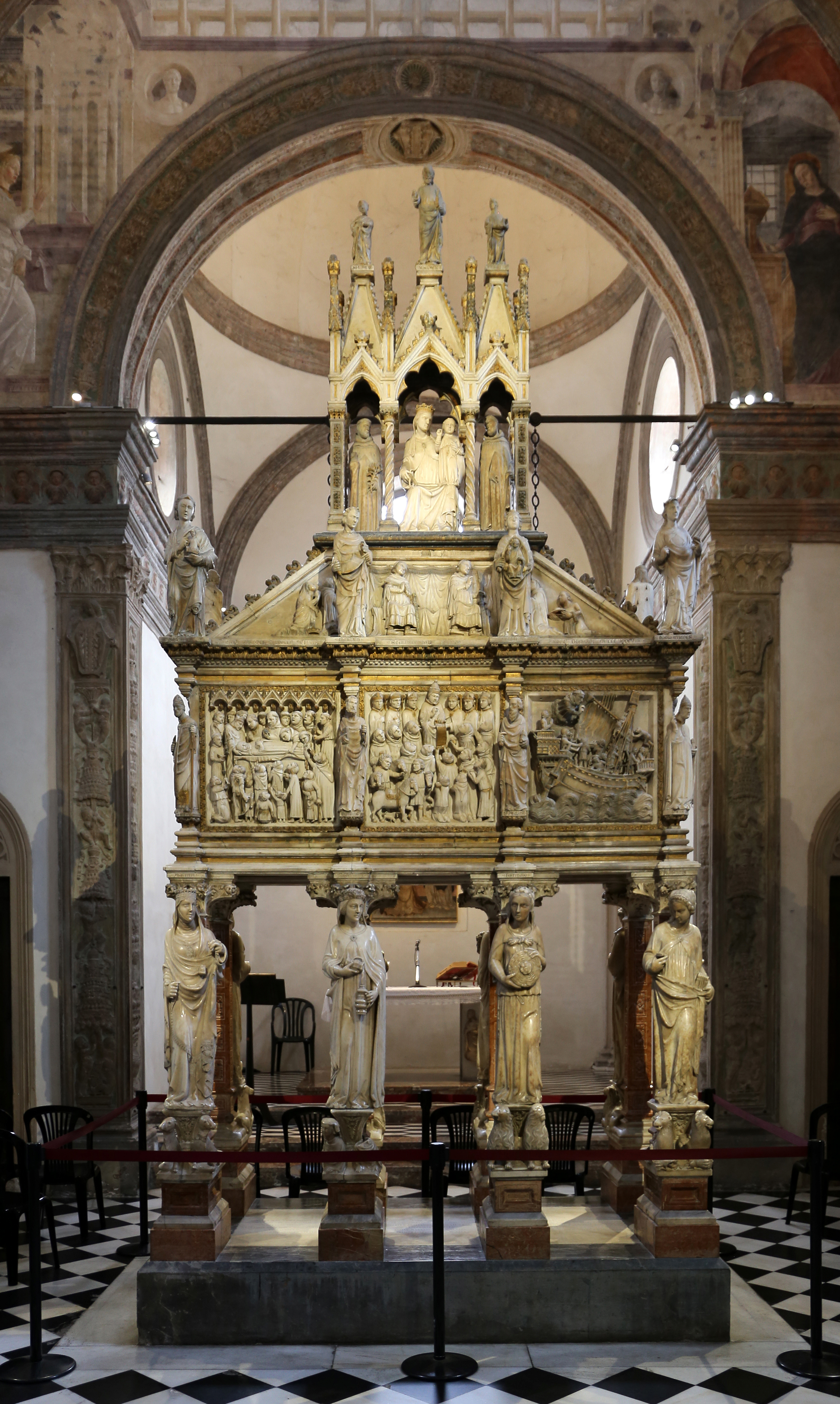
Giovanni di Balduccio, Arca di San Pietro Martire, marble, 1336–1339, Basilica of Sant'Eustorgio, Milan

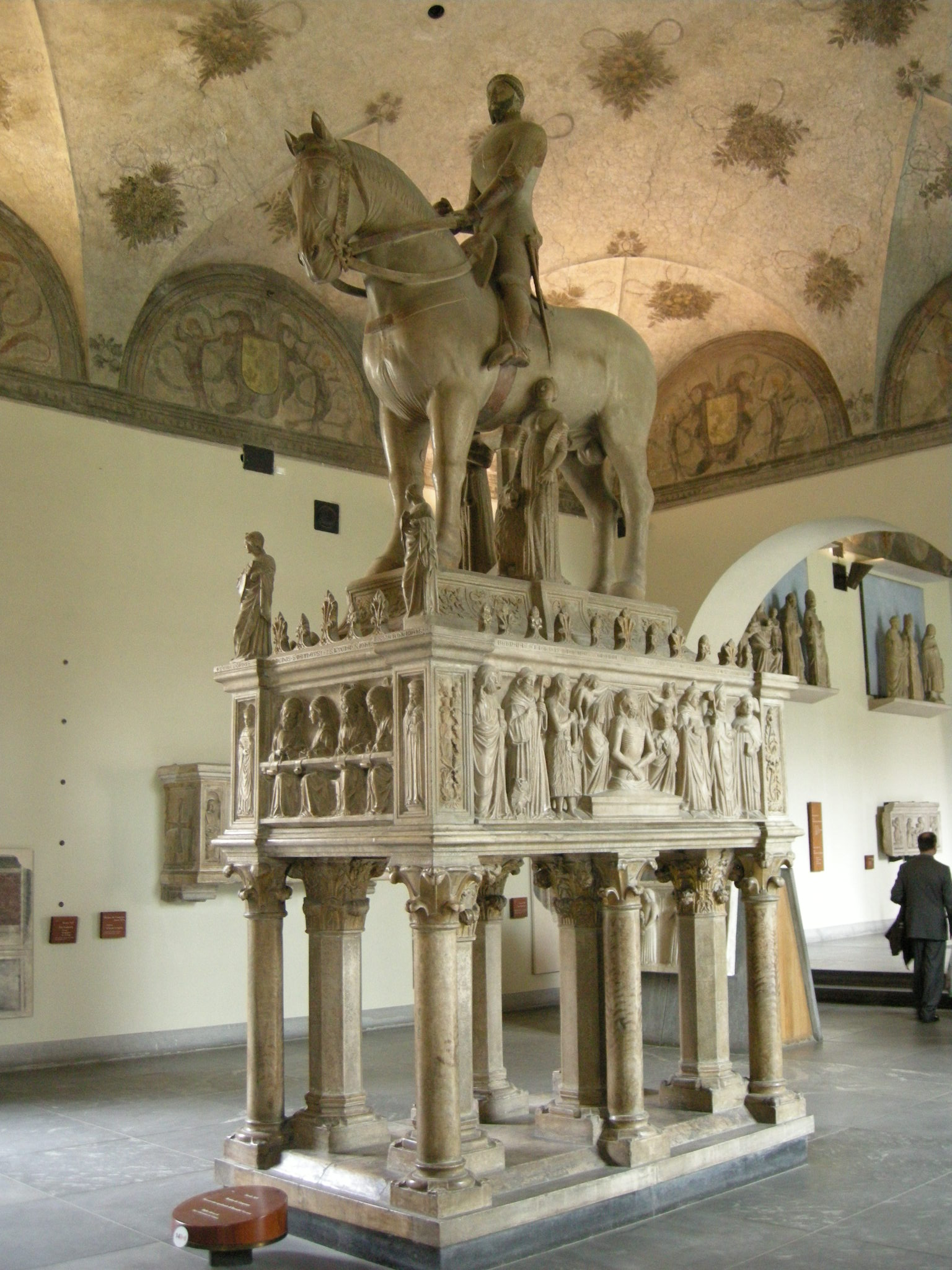
Bonino da Campione, Equestrian monument to Bernabò Visconti, marble, 1363, Castello Sforzesco, Milan

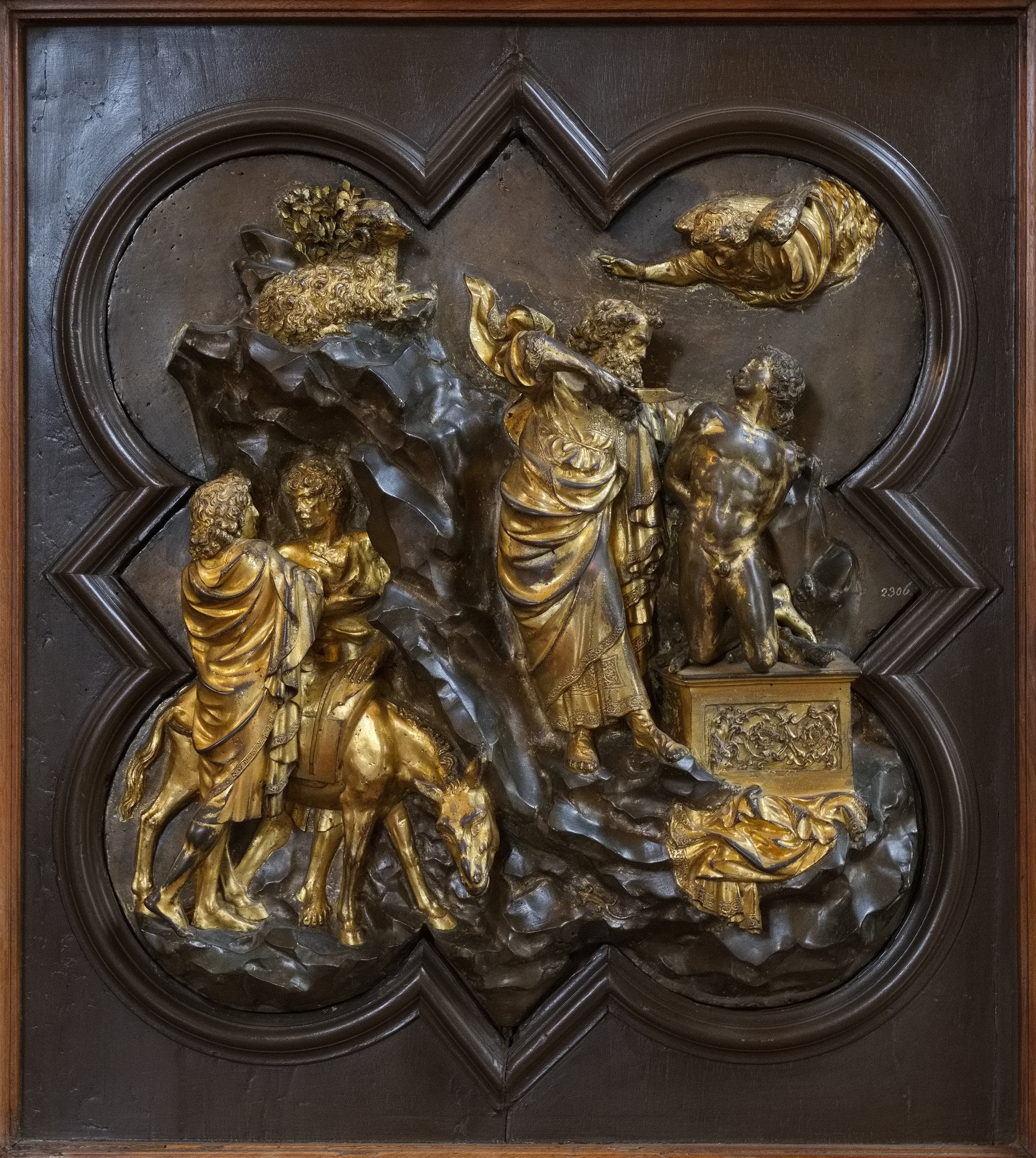
Lorenzo Ghiberti, Sacrifice of Isaac, gilded bronze, 1401, Bargello, Florence

== Work methods ==
During the Gothic period, none of the various sculpting techniques experienced any essential innovations, although in many of them there was a great and progressive refinement, but the concentration of work in stone and wood is a characteristic of this period since large pieces in bronze—by their cost and technical difficulty—became prohibitive.

The technique of indirect casting in lost wax which results in hollow sculptures—greatly cheapening production and making it possible to create large works—was only rediscovered in the mid-15th century. Thus, the most important practical aspects of it in the history of Gothic sculpture are its collective character and the role of guilds and production workshops.

When the Gothic style emerged in the 12th century, the main genre of sculpture was the facade, which was in close dependence on architecture. For the construction of a great cathedral—which could take centuries to complete and many never were—a kind of company, the opus, was formed, with a hierarchy organized under the general direction of the Church and an army of craftsmen under the command of a magister operis, the master builder (who was in charge of managing the supply of materials and the team) and of a magister lapidum (who was equivalent to the function of chief architect and his activities can be compared to those of the producer and director of a film). The workers and artisans had no important or decisive role, their subordination to the masters was virtually absolute, and these in turn, worked directly under ecclesiastical guidance.

Although the names of several Gothic architects are known, the independent artistic personality and the craftsman rising to the level of artist as we now conceive the term did not happen until the 14th century, when the urbanization was advanced enough to attract the best creators to establish private workshops in major cities.

Thus, until mid-14th century, basically all Gothic sculpture was anonymous and the product of many hands. But even when such private workshops began to multiply, the rule was that the master employed a series of assistants who collaborated in the execution of the pieces—a system that reproduced the great enterprises of the cathedrals albeit on a smaller scale—and even if now the creative personality of the master was clearer and he could better control the results, the final product was still mostly collective.

On the other hand, the existence of a growing number of autonomous artists required their organization in class associations, the guilds, which exercised considerable power in the distribution of contracts, in the methods of teaching apprentices, and sometimes even in the definition of aesthetic parameters. Though the guild prescriptions usually had much less influence on this last topic and the individual master preserved considerable freedom of choice and action, since the works were always made on commission—there was no spontaneous production—the taste of the patrons was decisive.

== Decline, revival, and modern appreciation ==
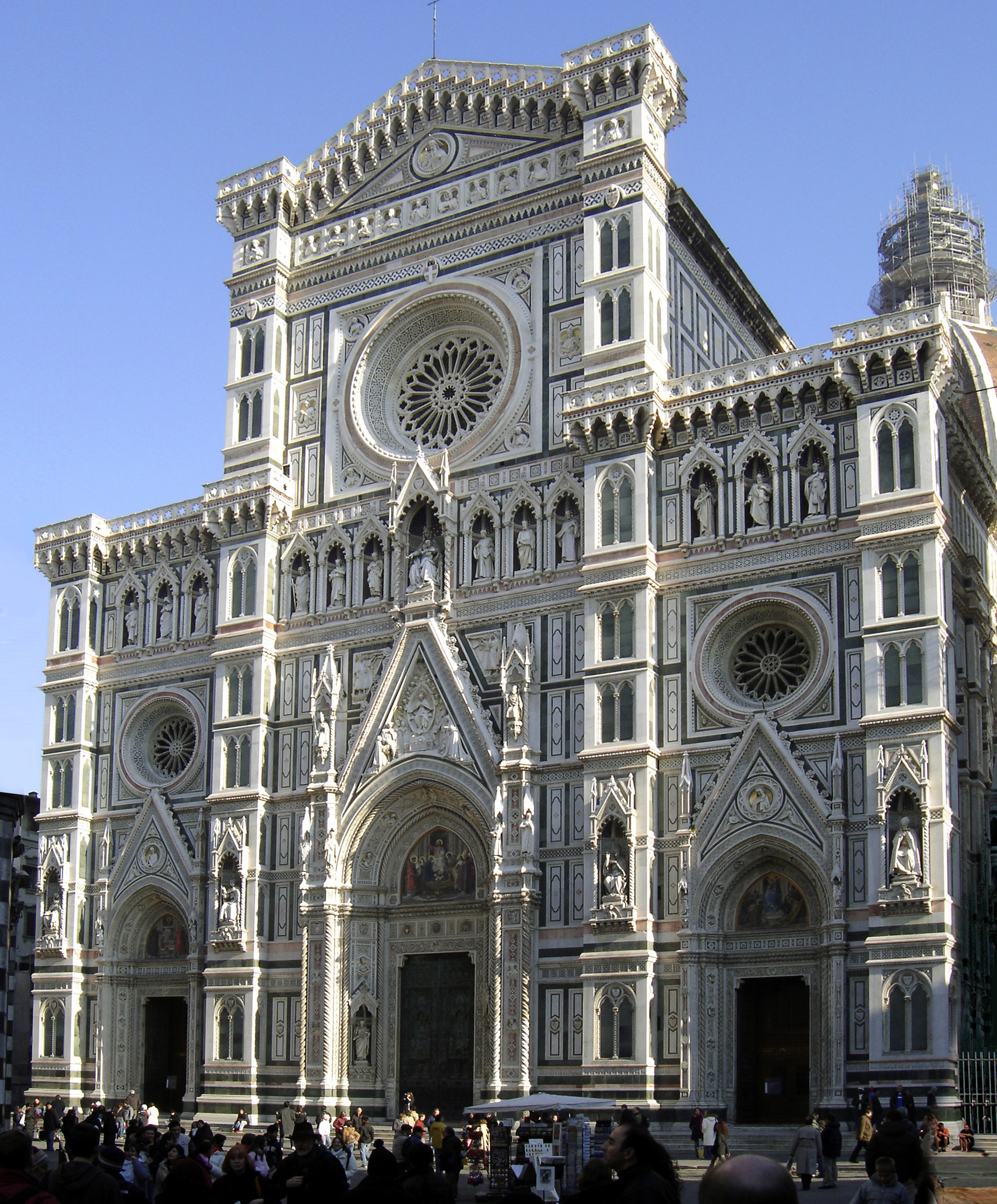
Neo-Gothic facade of the Florence Cathedral, Florence, Italy, with statuary decoration

With the intense revaluation of classicism during the Renaissance, Gothic sculpture fell into oblivion and remained so until mid-18th century, when a new interest in medieval subjects in general arose.

English, German, and French scholars played an important part in this rediscovery, such as Walpole, Goethe, and Chateaubriand, but this interest, still restricted to the intellectual elites, did not prevent countless other Gothic art relics and monuments from perishing in the French Revolution, vandalized by the people who had been encouraged to do so by decrees of the revolutionary government—such as that issued by the Paris Commune ordering the removal and beheading of all statues of kings from the facade of Notre Dame Cathedral, as a symbol of the deposed monarchy.

Early studies of the Gothic period focused on architecture, paying little attention to sculpture, which was then considered merely an ornamental accessory to buildings and had to compete with the immense prestige that classical Greco-Roman sculpture was enjoying. In 1822, Lepsius was the first to make a detailed study of the sculptures of Naumburg Cathedral, but he himself was biased by classicism and thus analyzed the Gothic production comparatively, to its detriment.

Nevertheless, Lepsius drew attention to the subject and valued it as an important historical and cultural resource. Subsequently, more studies began to appear, with more frequent mentions of sculpture but still within general analyses of medieval history. Historiography began to consolidate itself as a modern science, making use of a methodology based on documentation and more objective approaches, and a milestone in this process was the influential study Handbuch der Kunstgeschichte (1842), by Franz Kluger, where for the first time entire sections were devoted to sculpture—although he recognized that the ground was still to be covered.

Another important contribution was made by Carl Schnaase in his Geschichte der bildenden Künste (1842–1864), with five volumes dedicated to the Middle Ages and concerned with studying the monuments within a social, intellectual and historical context. The major importance of this study was to question the general tendency to analyze medieval artistic production based on criteria used to judge classical art.

At the same time, the development of Christian archaeology came to define the Gothic as the style of Christianism par excellence, and several specialized journals appeared from the mid-19th century with articles dealing with individual works or groups of Gothic sculpture—but typically they tended to divorce the works from their context and dealt more with iconographic aspects and theological interpretations, without a synthetic view.

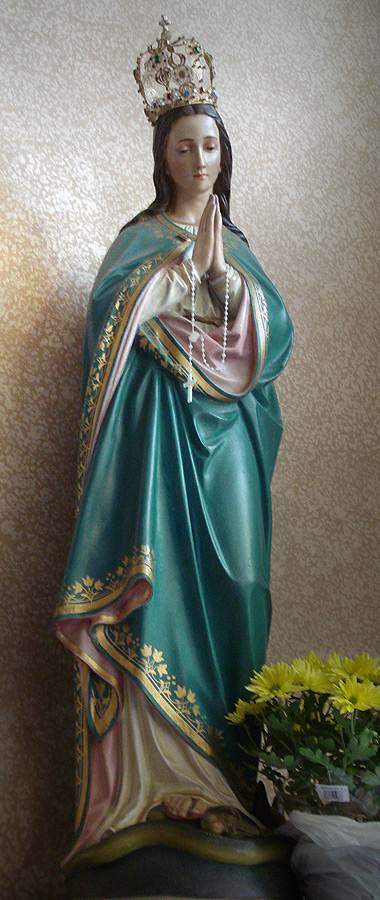
Neo-gothic image of the Immaculate Conception, Nosso Senhor dos Passos Chapel, Porto Alegre, early 20th century

By then, interest in the Middle Ages in general and the Gothic period in particular had grown so much that a veritable neo-Gothic revivalist wave was formed, which had repercussions mainly in architecture, literature and painting.

Some studies suggest that during the Neo-Gothic period—which lasted until the mid-20th century and spread throughout the West—more "Gothic" buildings were erected than during the entire period when the original style flourished. Meanwhile, Neo-Gothic proved to be eclectic, incorporating elements of the Neoclassical and Romantic schools and of several distinct phases of historical Gothic into a single work, and thus, rather than an archaeological resurrection, it acquired the force of a new and autonomous style. This interest has also contributed to the formation of collections of Gothic art and the initiation of many projects for the restoration of ancient monuments, although not always respecting strict historical authenticity.

A more thorough and scientific treatment of Gothic sculpture did not come until the end of the 19th century, with Wilhelm Lübcke's Geschichte der Plastik von den ältesten Zeiten bis auf die Gegenwart (1863–1871). In it, Lübcke first constructed a "total" overview of the history of sculpture from the ancient Near Eastern civilizations to modern times, plus many illustrations, and recognized that medieval sculpture was being unduly neglected. At the same time, works by Wilhelm Boden, Franz von Reber and especially Wilhelm Vöge finally established Gothic sculpture as a defined field of study, while Giovanni Morelli, Émile Mâle, Louis Courajod and others devoted themselves to questions of regionalisms, iconography, specific periods, genealogy and interpretation of the style.

The new use of photography as a means of scientific documentation also provided fundamental assistance to scholars and made the Gothic monuments known to the general public. Another factor that contributed to a re-evaluation of Gothic sculpture was that since the end of the 18th century, several religious orders were dissolved in various countries and many medieval buildings were dismantled or renovated, whose decorative statuary ended up in museum collections. With this, detached from its function, they could be appreciated as "works of art", independent of the cult and its mystical aspect.

In the 20th century weren made important—and often controversial—contributions on various aspects of the style:

- Wilhelm Worringer, whose ideas on the Gothic period had an impact on Expressionism and other modernist avant-gardes and also on pre-Nazi Germanic nationalism.
- Hans Seldmayer and Erwin Panofsky, defining the Gothic cathedral as a "total work of art" (Gesamtkunstwerk).
- And also Johan Huizinga and Arnold Hauser, correlating art and society.

But despite the significant progress made recently in medieval studies and the considerable bibliography already published on cathedral architecture, Gothic sculpture as an independent entity is still a subject relatively unaddressed by modern researchers.
