= List of Gothic artists =

This is a list of Gothic artists.

- Mastro Guglielmo 12th Century Italian Sculptor
- Maestro Esiguo 13th Century
- Master of the Franciscan Crucifixes 13th Century Italian
- Benedetto Antelami 1178–1196 Italian Sculptor
- Bonaventura Berlinghieri 1215–1242 Italian Painteiiii
- Nicola Pisano 1220–1284 Italian Sculptor
- Fra Guglielmo 1235–1310 Italian Sculptor
- Guido Bigarelli 1238–1257 Italian Sculptor
- Giovanni Pisano 1250–1314 Italian Sculptor
- Duccio di Buoninsegna 1255–1318 Italian Painter
- Lorenzo Maitani 1255–1330 Italian Sculptor/Architect
- Arnolfo di Cambio 1264–1302 Italian Sculptor
- Arnau Bassa 14th Century Spanish Painter
- Master of San Francesco Bardi 14th Century Italian Painter
- Master of San Jacopo a Mucciana 14th Century Italian
- Ferrer Bassa 1285–1348 Spanish Painter
- Simone Martini 1285–1344 Italian Painter
- Tino da Camaino 1285–1337 Italian Sculptor
- Evrard d'Orleans 1292–1357 French Sculptor
- Andrea Pisano 1295–1348 Italian Sculptor
- Jacopo del Casentino 1297–1358 Italian Painter
- Segna di Buonaventure 1298–1331 Italian Painter
- Giovanni da Balduccio 1300–1360 Italian Sculptor
- Jean Pucelle 1300–1355 French Manuscript Illuminator
- Goro di Gregorio 1300–1334 Italian Sculptor
- Gano di Fazio 1302–1318 Italian Sculptor
- Vitale da Bologna 1309–1360 Italian Painter
- Agostino di Giovanni 1310–1347 Italian Sculptor
- Allegretto Nuzi 1315–1373 Italian Painter
- Giottino 1320–1369 Italian Painter
- Giusto de Menabuoi 1320–1397 Italian Painter
- Puccio Capanna 1325–1350 Italian Painter
- Theodoric of Prague ?–1381 Czech Painter
- Altichiero 1330–1384 Italian Painter
- Bartolo di Fredi 1330–1410 Italian Painter
- Peter Parler 1330–1399 German Sculptor
- André Beauneveu 1335–1400 Netherlandish Painter/Sculptor
- Master of the Dominican Effigies 1336–1345 Italian Painter
- Niccolo di Pietro Gerini c. 1340–1414 Italian Painter
- Guariento di Arpo 1338–1377 Italian Painter
- Jacobello dalle Masegne ?–1409 Italian Sculptor
- Giovanni da Campione 1340–1360 Italian Sculptor
- Master of the Rebel Angels 1340–1345 Italian Painter
- Andrea da Firenze 1343–1377 Italian Painter
- Nino Pisano 1343–1368 Italian Painter/Sculptor
- Puccio di Simone 1345–1365 Italian Painter
- Nicolo da Bologna 1348–1399 Italian
- Bonino da Campione 1350–1390 Italian Sculptor
- Lluís Borrassà 1350–1424 Spanish Painter
- Jacquemart de Hesdin 1350–1410 French Miniaturist
- Giovanni da Milano 1350–1369 Italian Painter
- Master of the Rinuccini Chapel 1350–1375 Italian
- Claus Sluter 1350–1406 Flemish Sculptor
- Giovanni Bon 1355–1443 Italian Sculptor/Architect
- Melchior Broederlam 1355–1411 Netherlandish Painter
- Giovanni del Biondo 1356–1399 Italian Painter
- Pere Serra 1357–1406 Spanish Painter
- Gherardo Starnina 1360–1413 Italian Painter
- Jean de Liege 1361–1382 Flemish Sculptor
- Taddeo di Bartolo 1362–1422 Italian Painter
- Jean Malouel 1365–1415 Netherlandish Painter
- Gentile da Fabriano 1370–1427 Italian Painter
- Lorenzo Monaco 1370–1425 Italian Painter
- Stefano da Verona 1375–1438 Italian Painter
- Pere Oller 1394–1442 Spanish Sculptor
- Master of Saint Veronica 1395–1420 German Painter
- Bernat Martorell Died 1452 Spanish Painter
- Fra Angelico 1395–1455 Italian Painter
- Jacopo Bellini 1400–1470 Italian Painter
- Pere Johan c. 1400 Spanish Sculptor
- Hermann Jean and Paul Limbourg 1400 Netherlandish Manuscript Illuminator
- Master of the Passion of Christ 15th-century Swedish Painter
- Master of the Berswordt Altar 1400 German Painter
- Upper Rhenish Master fl. c. 1410–1420 German Painter
- Jacomart 1410–1461 Spanish Painter
- Meister Hartmann fl. c. 1417–1428 German Sculptor
- Jaume Huguet 1412–1492 Spanish Painter
- Henri Bellechose 1415–1440 Flemish Painter
- Jörg Syrlin the Elder c. 1425–1491 German Sculptor
- Jörg Syrlin the Younger c. 1455–1521 German Sculptor
- Master of Schloss Lichtenstein fl. c. 1430–1450 Austrian Painter
- Bernt Notke c. 1435–1508 German Sculptor and Painter
- Albertus Pictor c. 1440–1507 German Painter (active in Sweden)
- Niklaus Weckmann c. 1481–1526 German Sculptor
- Daniel Mauch c. 1477–1540 German Sculptor
- Michel Erhart c. 1440-45–after 1522 German Sculptor
- Jan Polack Polish-German Painter
- Nicolaus Haberschrack Polish Painter
- Jan Goraj Polish Painter
- Jordan Painter fl. c. 1470–1480 Swedish Painter
- Master of the Drapery Studies fl. c. 1470−1500 German Draughtsman and Painter
- Gil de Siloé c. 1450–1501 Spanish Sculptor
- Veit Stoss c. 1450–1533 German Sculptor
- Hermen Rode fl. c. 1468–1504 German Painter
- Henning von der Heide c. 1460–1521 German Sculptor
- Cola Petruccioli 1362–1408 Triptych Painter
