= Museum Ulm =

Museum in Ulm, Germany

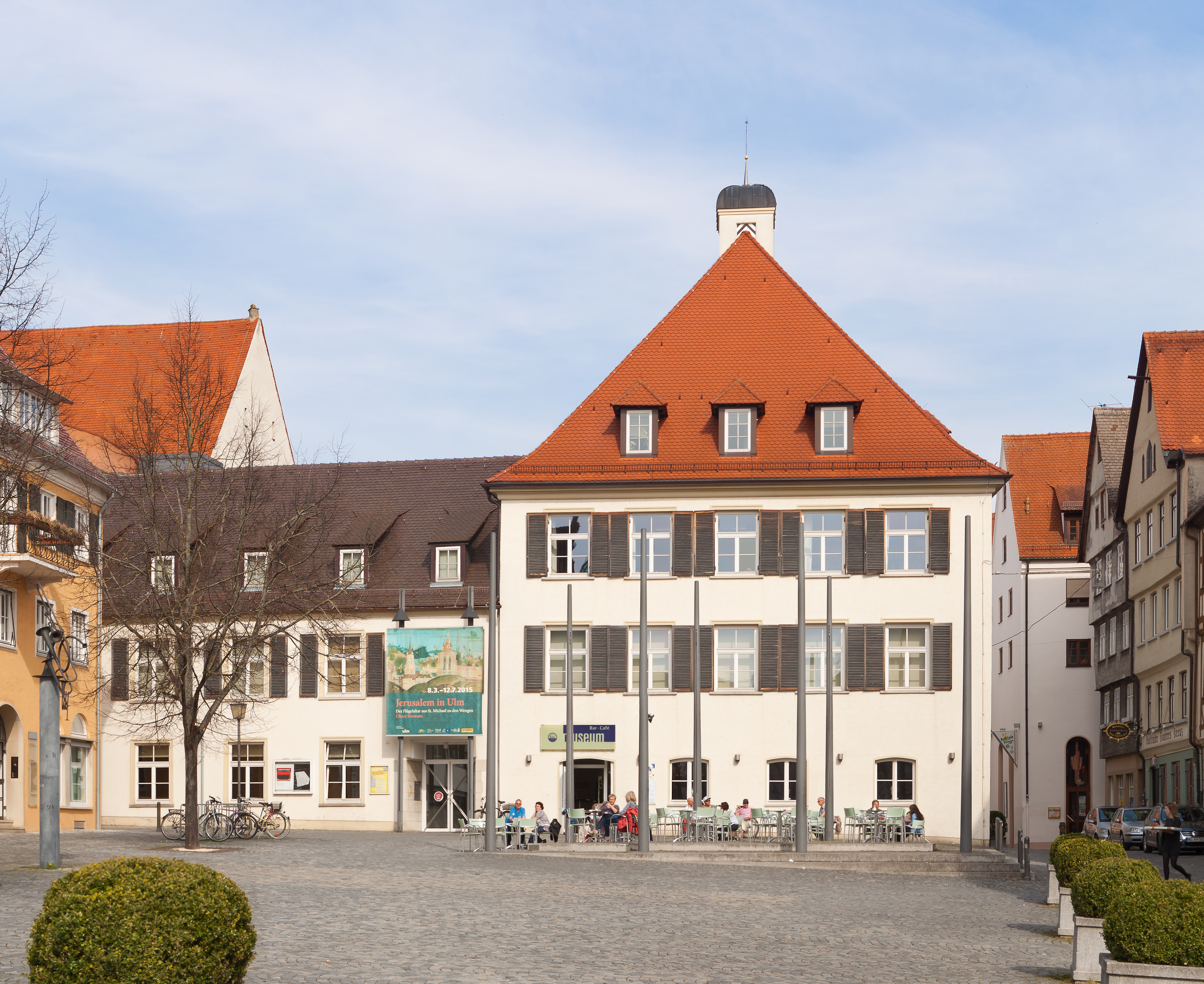
- Former names: Ulmer Museum, Museum der Stadt Ulm
- Established: 1924
- Location: Ulm, Baden-Württemberg
- Coordinates: 48°23′49″N 9°59′41″E
- Director: Stefanie Dathe
- Curators: Stefanie Dathe, Eva Leistenschneider, Viviane Bolin, Andreas Sattler, Marina Nething
- Website: www.museumulm.de/en

The Museum Ulm (Museum der Stadt Ulm), founded in 1924, is a museum for art, archeology, urban and cultural history in Ulm, Germany.

Exhibits range from prehistoric and early archaeological finds of the Ulm region (including the Lion-man statuette) to Late (International) Gothic and Renaissance paintings and sculptures made in Ulm and Upper Swabia. Collections of 16th-to-19th-century artisan works by Ulm's handicraft guilds are also presented. Conservator and university professor Julius Baum became the museum’s founding director and its first art historian on 1 April 1924. According to his successor Erwin Treu, "this started the real history" as "an institute emerged from a junk room".

== Exhibits ==
=== Prehistory ===
The museum's permanent archaeological exhibition was redesigned in 2014 after further fragments of a 35,000 to 41,000-year-old mammoth ivory sculpture were recovered at the original site in the Lone Valley. This Lion-man figurine is a human with the head and the limbs of a lion. In an extremely complex restoration process in 2012/13, the figurine was completely re-assembled from over 300 fragments and has since revealed new details.

In addition to the lion-man from the Hohlenstein-Stadel cave, the prehistoric environment of the Swabian Jura mountains is also documented. Numerous exhibits from the Upper Paleolithic to the Neolithic period, including the finds from the neighboring Bockstein Cave are shown. There is, above all, the exhibit of a Neanderthal thigh bone, the only substantial piece of evidence of this species ever found in Baden-Württemberg. Also on display are the artefacts of Mesolithic burials of the Bockstein Cave and the Hohlenstein-Stadel.

=== Middle Ages and modernity ===
Many works of important representatives of the Late Gothic Ulm School are presented in the museum. A chronology of the region's International Gothic period has been demonstrated, supported by valuable exhibits beginning with Meister Hartmann and Hans Multscher to Martin Schaffner, Michel Erhart, Hans Schüchlin, Jörg Stocker, Niklaus Weckmann, Bartholomäus Zeitblom to Daniel Mauch. The Late Gothic cultural landscape of Upper Swabia and the Allgäu is illustrated by the works of Bernhard Strigel and others, which allows valuable direct style studies and comparisons.

Representative works of artists of the 20th and 21st centuries additionally belong to the Ulm collection—among them Paul Klee, Ernst Ludwig Kirchner, August Macke and Franz Marc. Another highlight is the nternational Kurt Fried Collection. Amongst publisher Kurt Fried's 1959 to 1981 private collection the visitor will find works by Frank Stella, Mark Rothko, Roy Lichtenstein, Günther Uecker, Yves Klein, Daniel Spoerri, Josef Albers, Max Bill and Gerhard Richter.

The museum presents a variety of exhibitions in order to make the complicated relations among Ulm's Late Gothic artists come to light. The focus of research is on the Ulm families of artists around Hans Multscher, Jörg Syrlin the Elder, Jörg Syrlin the Younger, Michel Erhart, Gregor Erhart and Daniel Mauch.

Since 14 November 1999 there has been a new presentation in the extension building on the subject of European and American Art after 1945. In addition, 20th-century graphic art and modernity are presented in temporary exhibitions.

In November 2024, the museum announced that it would return five objects acquired from art dealer Siegfried Lämmle in 1936 and 1937, although the pieces will remain in the museum. The objects had been acquired after the Nazis forced him to close his art shop in Munich. Follow three years of research by the Koordinierungsstelle für Kulturgutverluste (Coordination Center for Lost Cultural Assets), it was found that the objects were acquired by the museum at prices well below what Lämmle would have accepted under normal circumstances. Nearly 32,000 further pages of letters detailing sale prices during the Nazi era are being digitized and scrutinized.

=== Galleries ===
Late Gothic sculptures
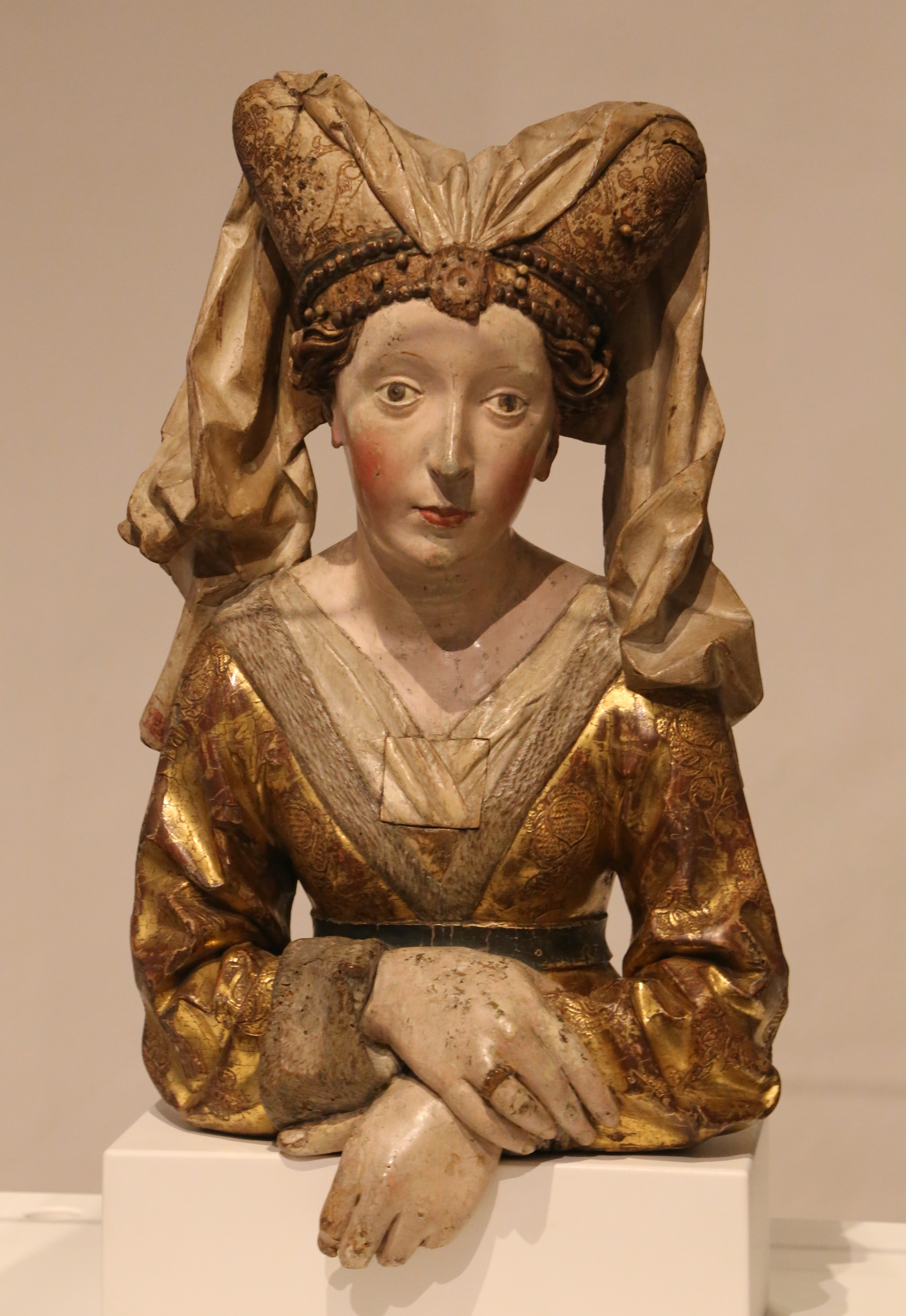
Michel Erhart, reliquary (bust of Mary Magdalene), Ulm, c. 1475-80, tilia, Late Gothic, with modern additions

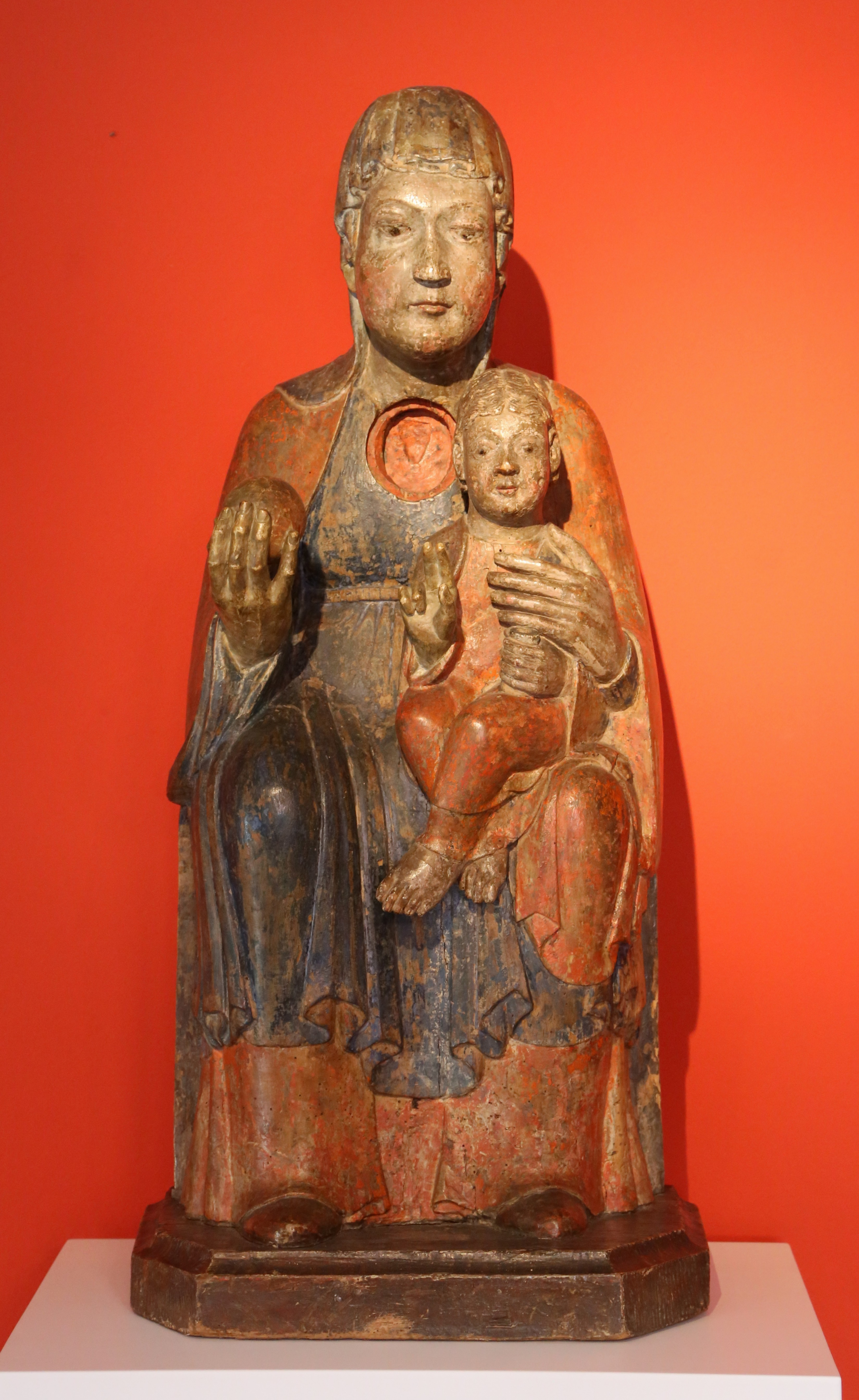
Enthroned Mary with infant, Upper Swabia, early 13th century, tilia, remainder of a newer version with several replacements

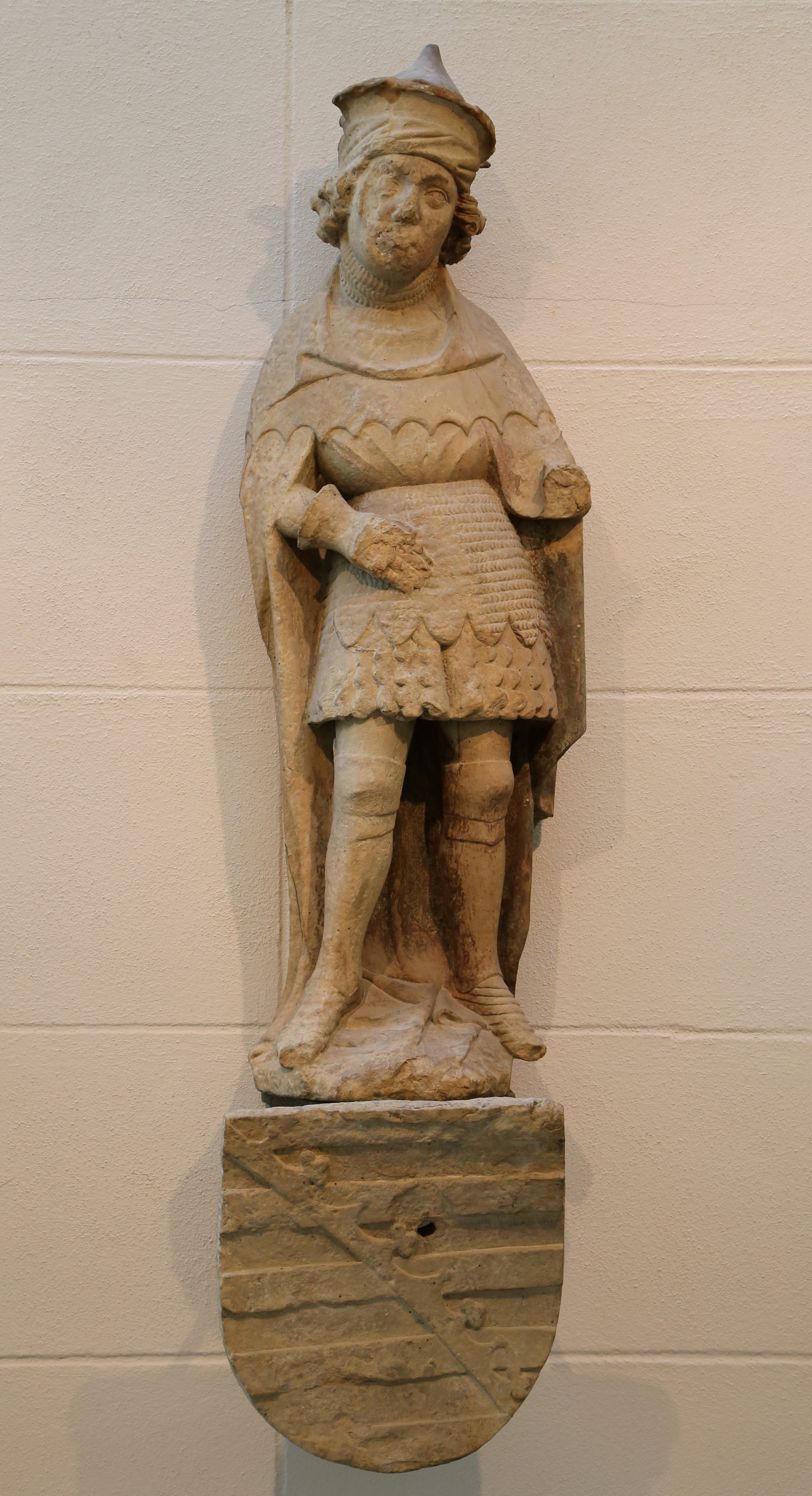
Meister Hartmann, The duke of Saxony, Ulm, c. 1420-25, sandstone

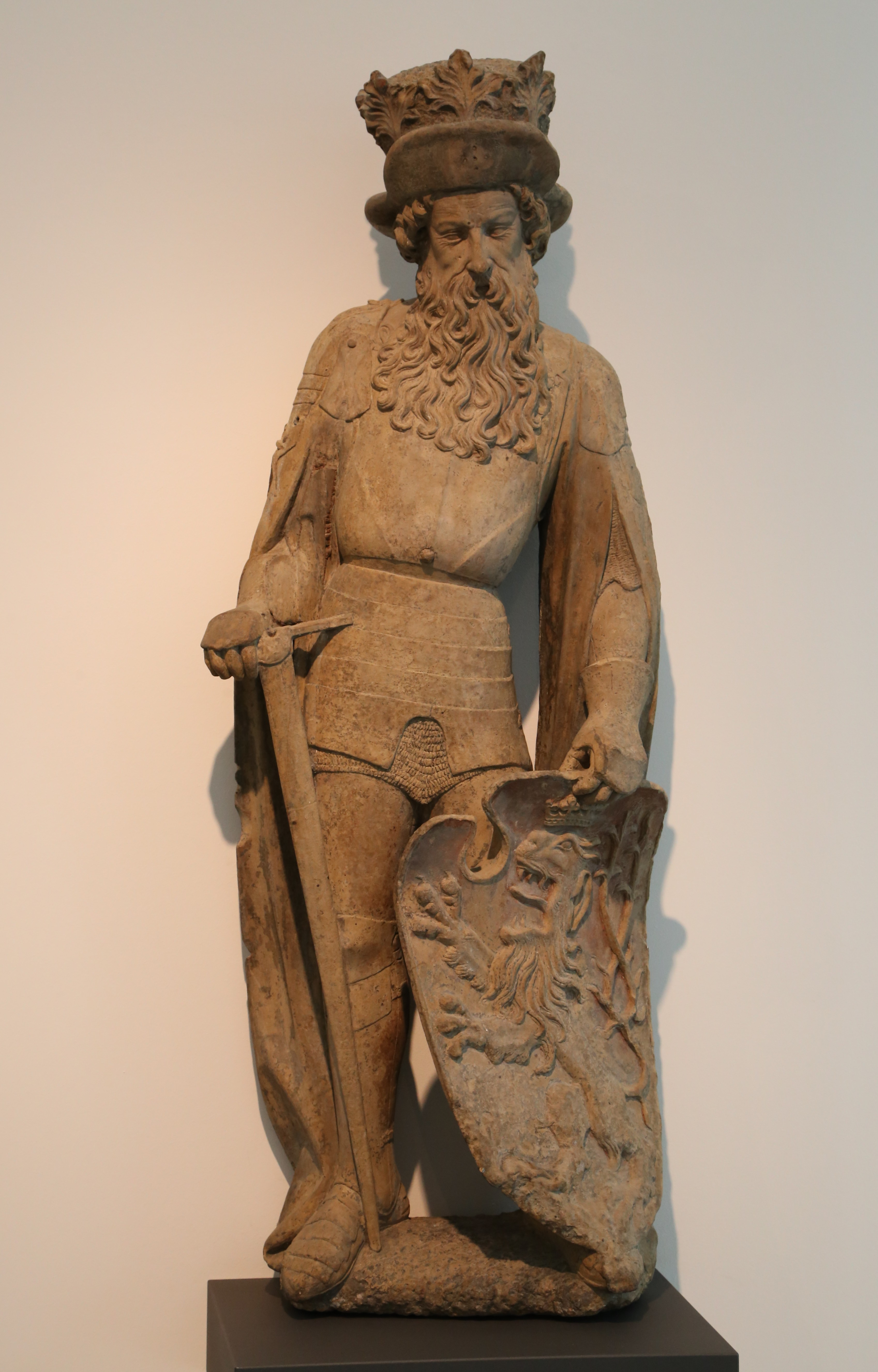
Hans Multscher, The king of Bohemia, c. 1427-33, sandstone

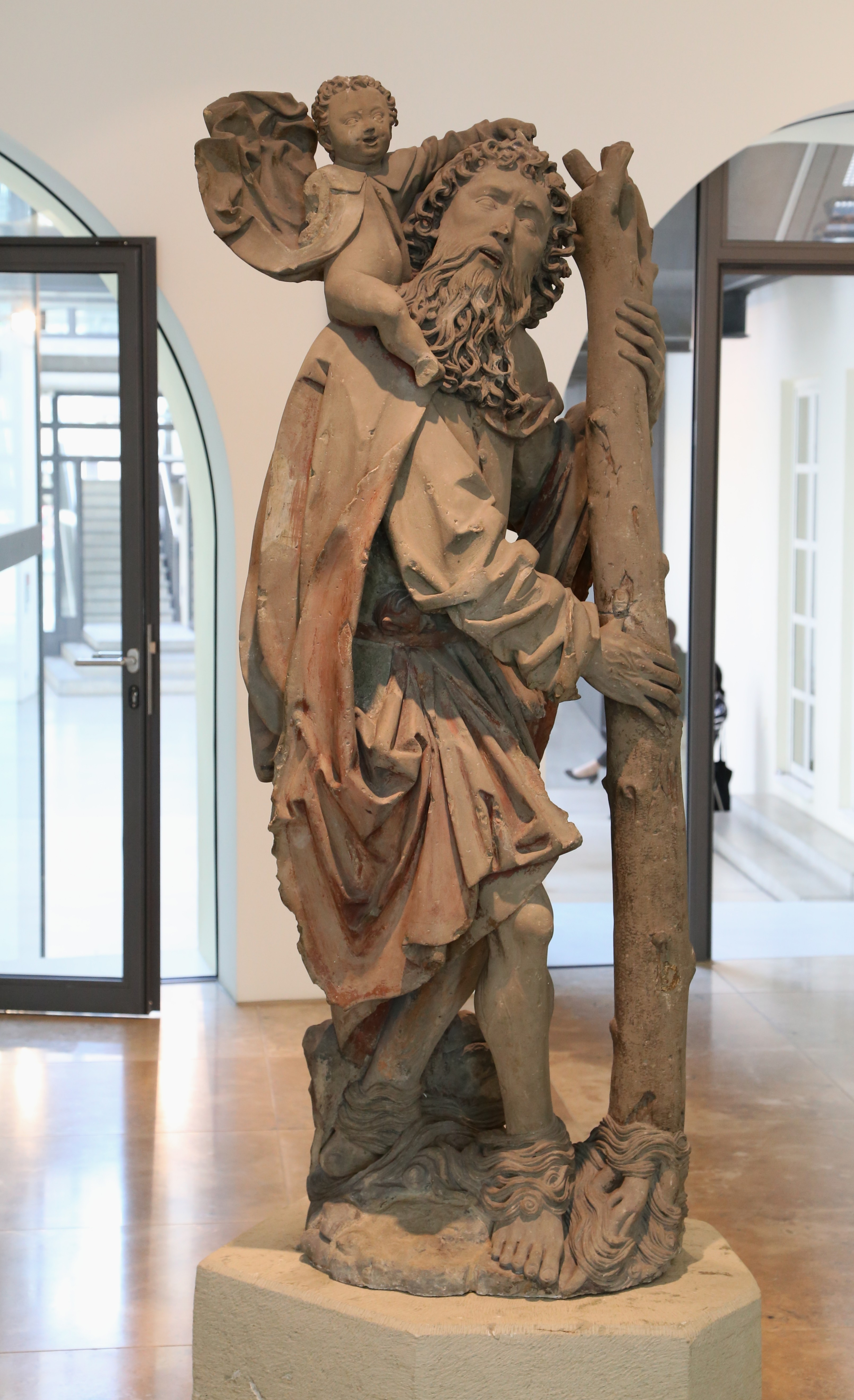
Michel Erhart, St. Christopher, Ulm, c. 1480, sandstone

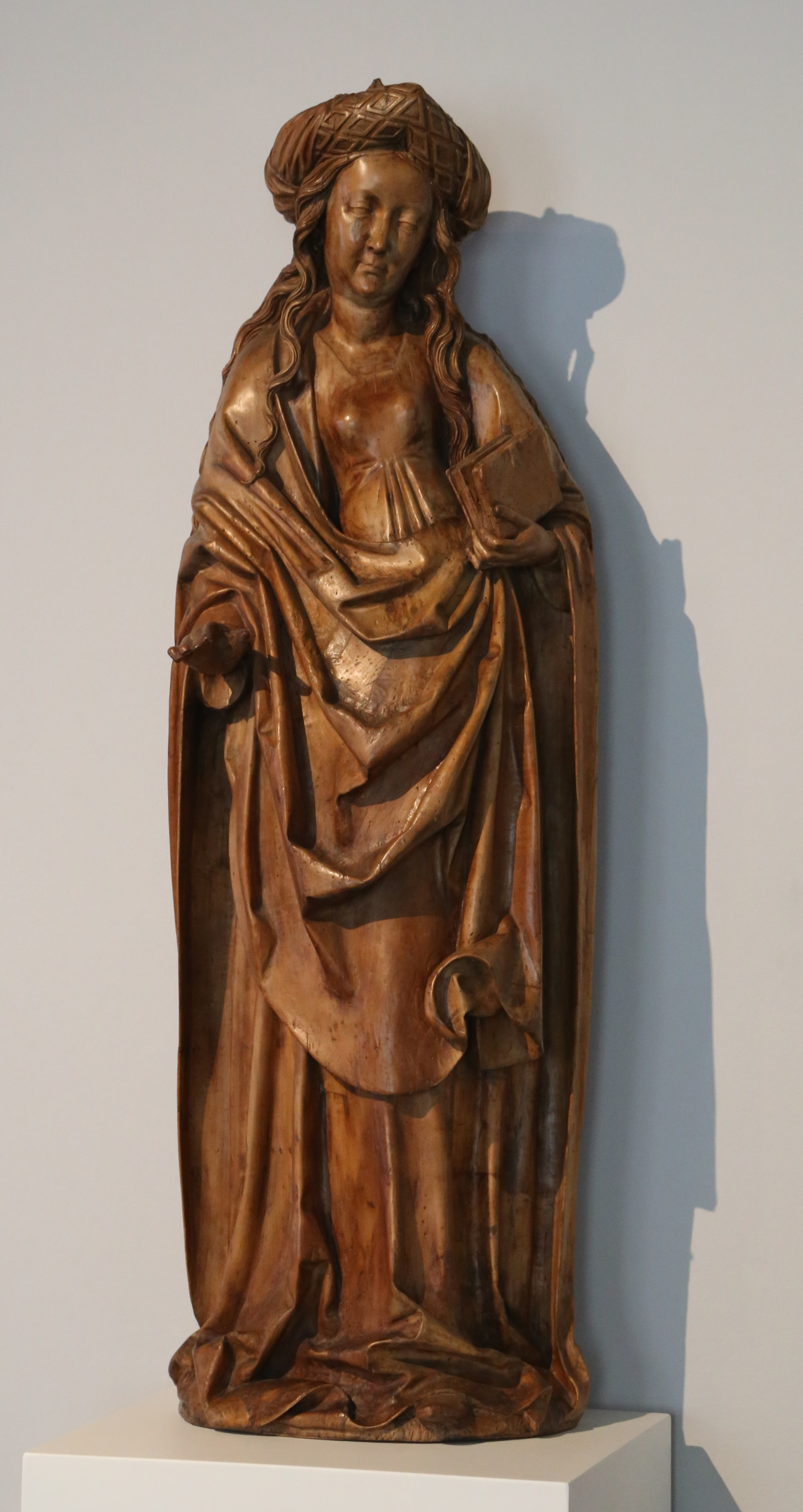
Niklaus Weckmann, St. Catherine, Ulm, c. 1510, tilia

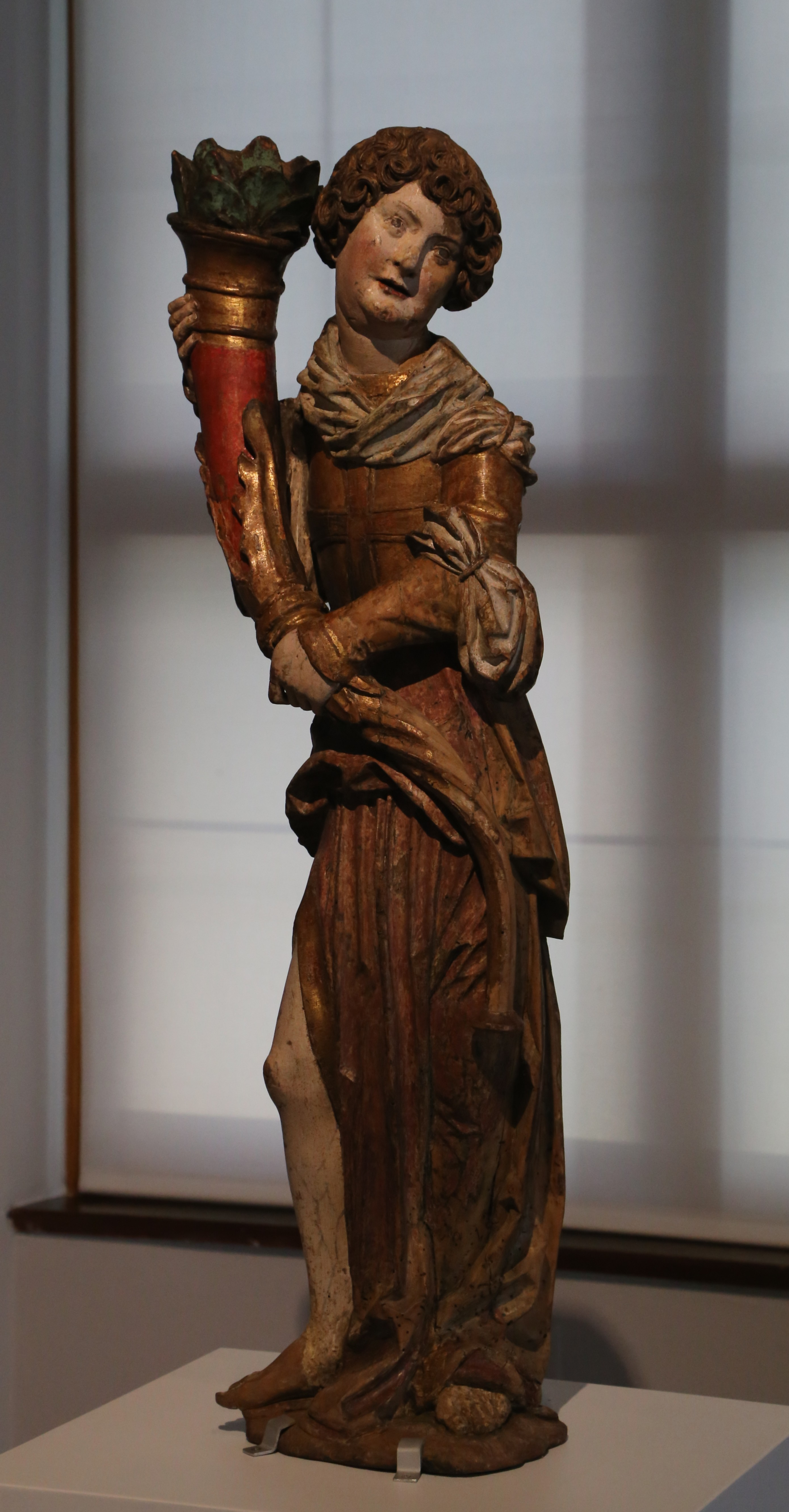
Daniel Mauch, Angel with cornucopia, Ulm, c. 1520, tilia, old version
Modern paintings
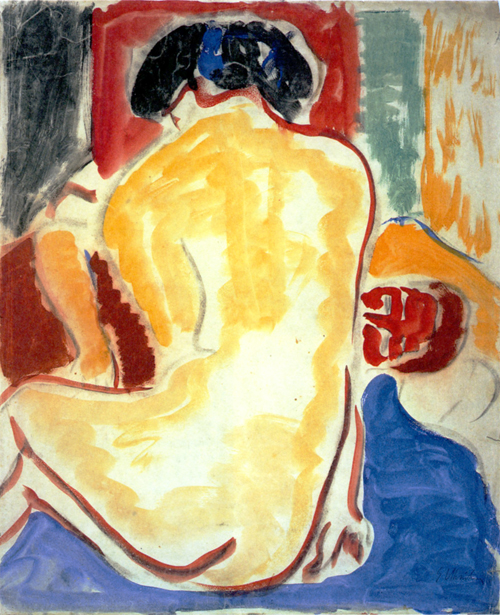
Ernst Ludwig Kirchner, Gelber Rückenakt, 1909, watercolor

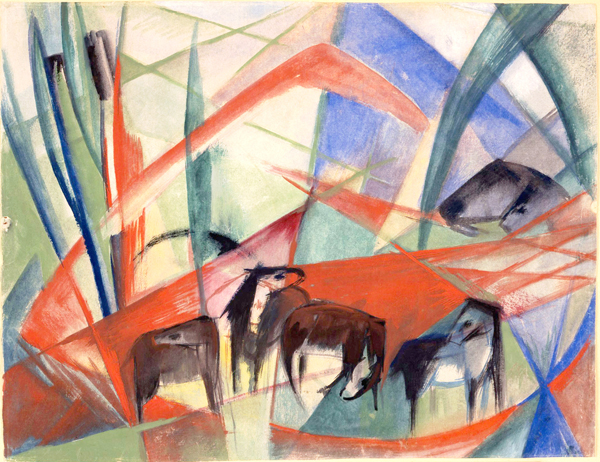
Franz Marc, Landschaft mit schwarzen Pferden, 1913, watercolor

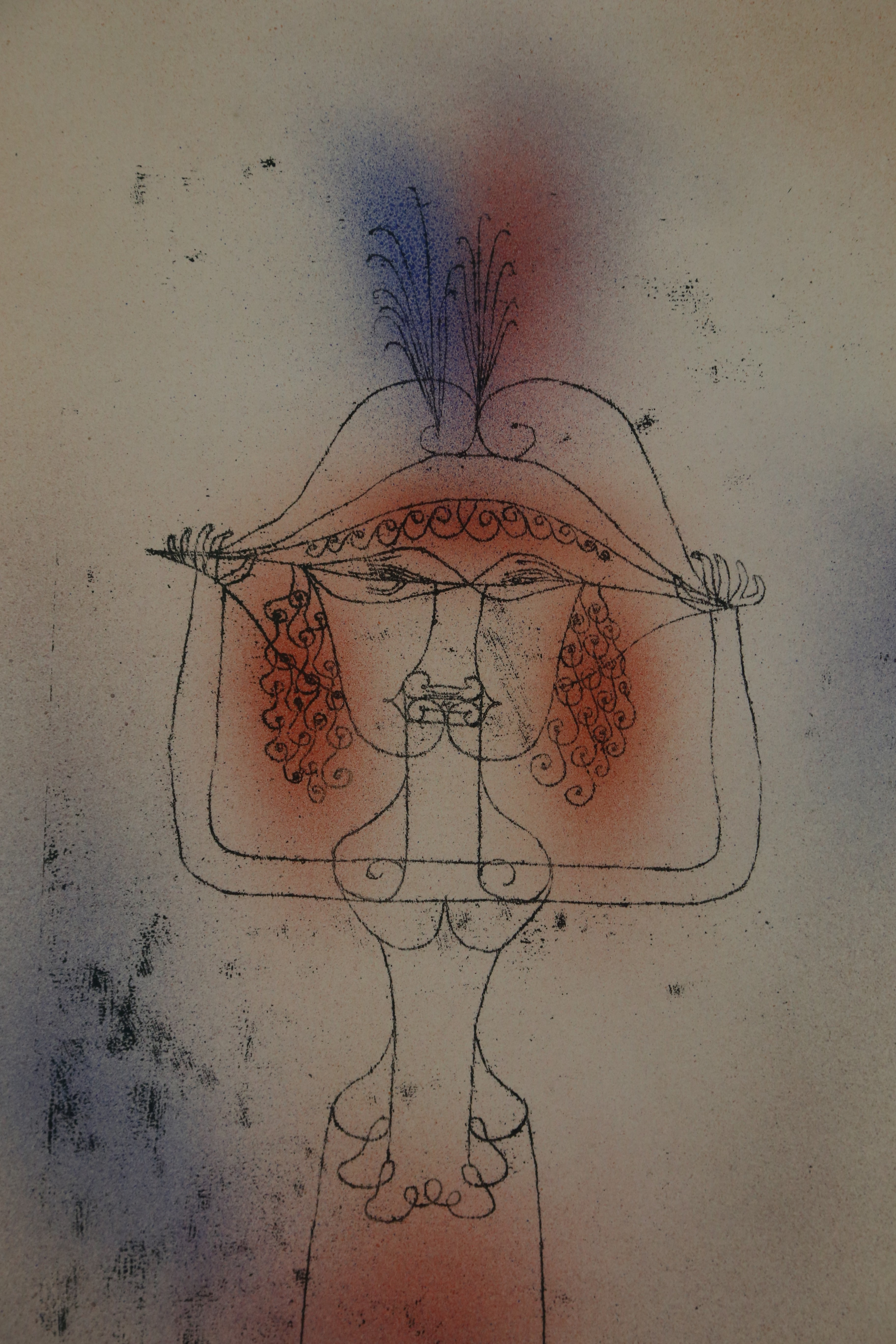
Paul Klee, Die Sängerin der komischen Oper, 1925, watercolored lithography on laid paper

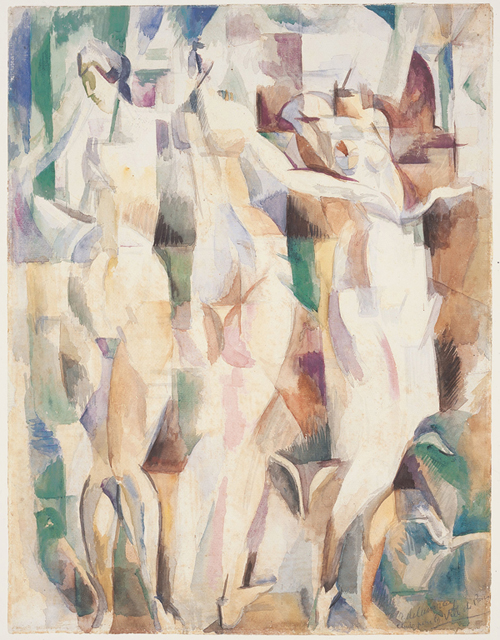
Robert Delaunay, Les trois grâces, 1912, watercolor

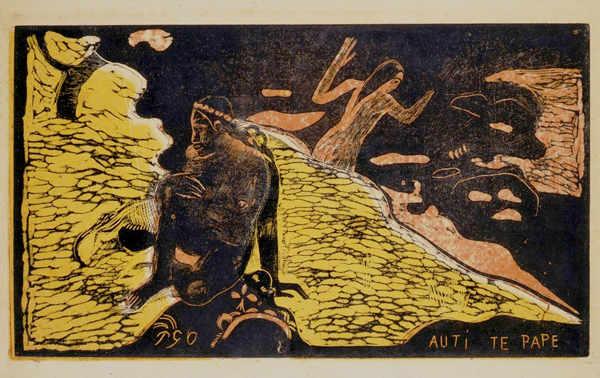
Paul Gauguin, Auti te pape - Les femmes à la rivière, between 1891 and 1893, woodcut on paper

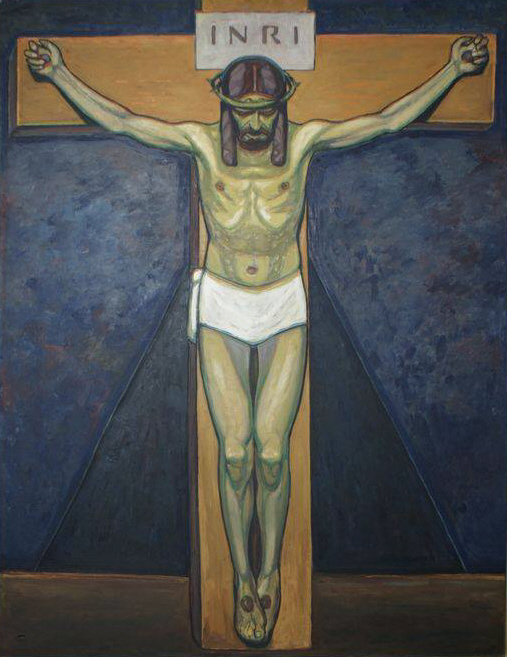
Adolf Hölzel, Studie zum Kruzifix-Bild in der Pauluskirche Ulm, c. 1910

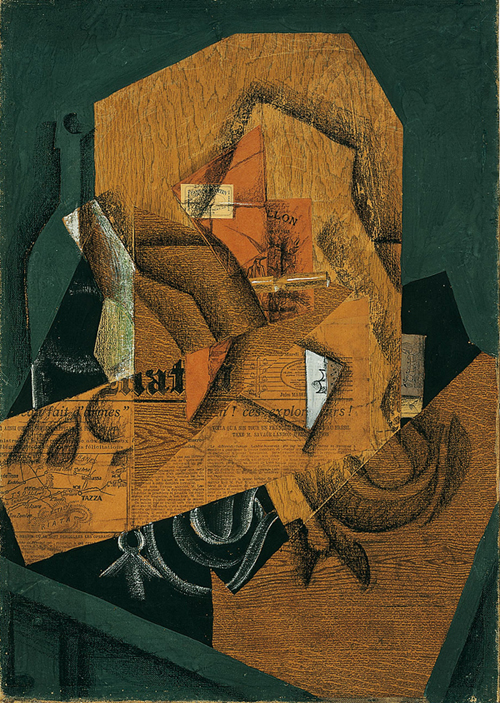
Juan Gris, Le paquet de café, 1914, gouache, collage and drawing on canvas

== Associated groups ==
The Friends of the Ulm Museum (Freunde des Ulmer Museums) was founded in 1982 in Ulm. Its members support the particular concerns of the Ulm Museum and promote its scientific work.

== Special exhibitions ==
A selection of the important exhibitions at the museum:

- 1995: Der Löwenmensch. Der gegenläufige Spannungsbogen von gestern und heute: der Löwenmensch, 32.000 Jahre zurück: zur neuesten Technologie: das Jüngste und das Älteste. In Zusammenarbeit mit dem Museum für Moderne Kunst München, 20. Januar – 5. März
- 2003: Tamara Grcic – Videos, Filme, Installationen, 20. Juli – 28. September
- 2003: Ulmer Bürgerinnen & Söflinger Klosterfrauen, 30. August – 23. November
- 2004: Carol Rama – Appassionata, 12. September – 14. November
- 2004: Arno Schmidt, Vier mal Vier – Fotografien aus Bargfeld, 4. Dezember 2004 bis 30. Januar 2005
- 2005: Emil Nolde, Blickkontakte, frühe Portraits, 2. April – 15. August
- 2005: Leiko Ikemura, Skulptur-Malerei-Zeichnung, 12. Februar – 24. April
- 2006: Charlotte Salomon, Leben? Oder Theater? In Zusammenarbeit mit dem Joods Historisch Museum, Amsterdam, (Stationen: 16. März – 3. Juni 2007 Taxispalais, Innsbruck; 22. Oktober 2006 bis 11. Februar 2007 Ulmer Museum; 12. Oktober 2005 bis 15. Januar 2006 Sprengel Museum, Hannover; 11. März 2005 bis 16. Mai 2005 Kunstsammlungen Chemnitz; 18. Juni – 22. August 2004 Das Städel, Frankfurt)
- 2006: Karin Kneffel, Verführung und Distanz // Seduction and Distance, (Stationen: Mönchehaus Museum, Goslar, Museum Sinclair-Haus, Bad Homburg)
- 2007: Die Kunst- und Wunderkammer des Christoph Weickmann, Reflektionen über eine Sammlung, 17. Februar – 29. April 2007
- 2008: Michaela Melián: Speicher, 19. April – 22. Juni 2008
- 2009: Kosmos und Marionette. Paul Klee und die Romantik, 8. März – 17. Mai 2009
- 2011: Die Weissenhofer: Radical Research – Die Wurzeln der Wissenschaft, 3. April – 29. Mai 2011
- 2015: MACK. Das Licht meiner Farben, 11. September 2015 bis 10. Januar 2016
- 2017: Walt Disney – Fantasien werden niemals alt, 20. Mai – 17. September 2017
- 2017: Erwarten Sie Wunder! Das Museum als Kuriositätenkabinett und Wunderkammer, 20. Mai – 15. Oktober 2017
