= Jörg Syrlin =

Jörg Syrlin may refer to:

- Jörg Syrlin the Elder (c. 1425 – 1491), German sculptor
- Jörg Syrlin the Younger (c. 1455 – 1521), German sculptor
