= Karl Voll =

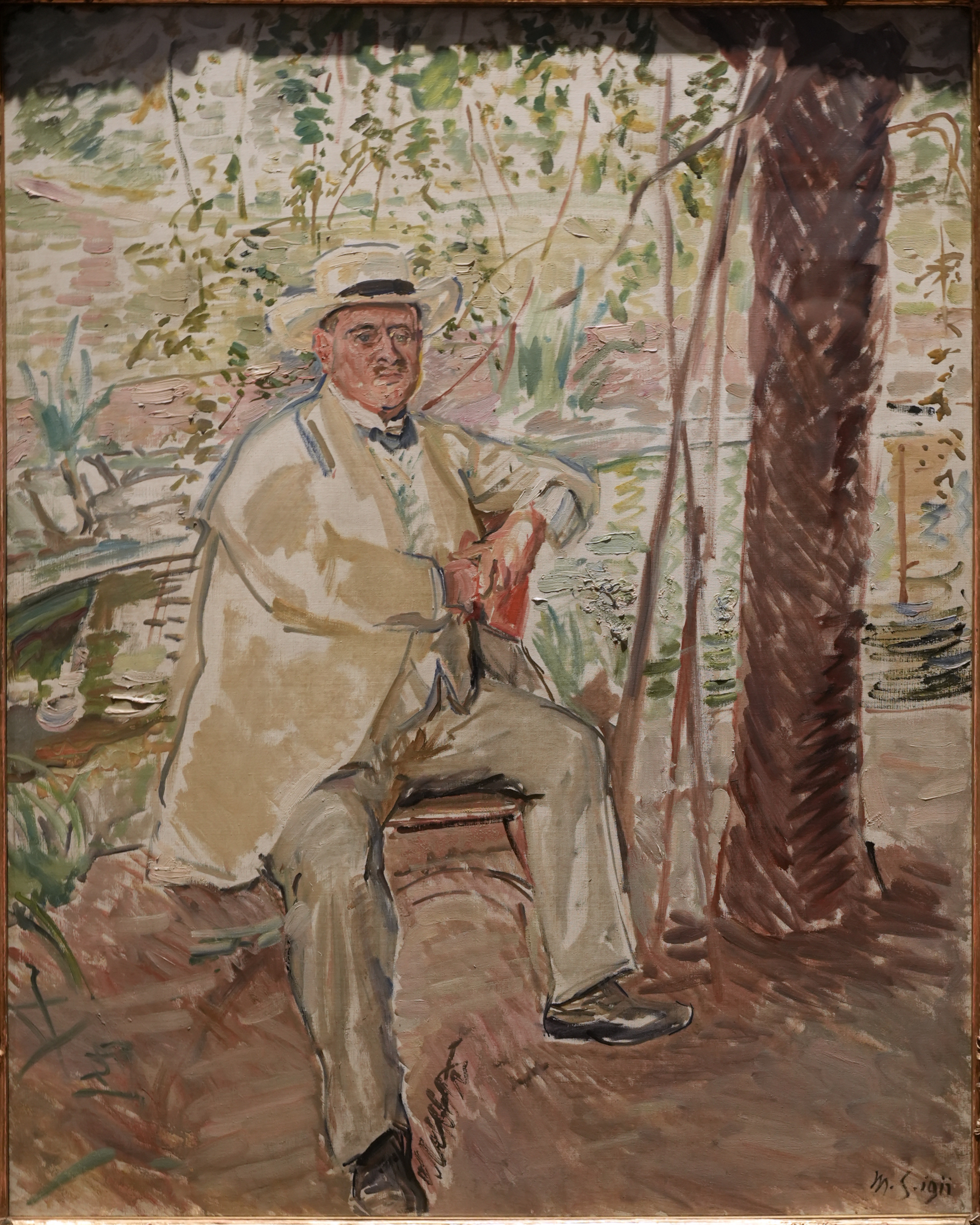
Portrait of Karl Voll by Max Slevogt (1911)

Karl Voll (18 July 1867 in Würzburg – 25 December 1917 in Munich) was a German art historian specialising in Dutch renaissance and baroque art.

== Career ==
Voll studied Romance languages and English at the Ludwig-Maximilians-Universität München, and from 1889 taught at a private school in Weyarn, from 1892 until 1896 in Freising. He later studied art history and from 1886 became a full-time art critic for the Allgemeine Zeitung. In 1896, he received his doctorate in Romance Studies at the Ludwig-Maximilians-Universität München, and in 1900, he graduated in Art History at the Ludwig-Maximilians-Universität München.

Later, both Wilhelm Hausenstein and Julius Baum studied under him.

== Selected works ==
- "The Painting Collection of Baron Albert Oppenheim, Cologne", 1917
- "The reorganization of the Alte Pinakothek", 1910
- "Die Werke des Jan van Eyck".
- "Memling: des Meisters Gemälde in 197 Abbildungen". Stuttgart und Leipzig: Deutsche Verlagsanstalt, 1909
- "Die Weltreligionen in ihrem geschichtlichen Zusammenhänge". E. Diederichs, 1907
- "Die Altniederlandische Malerei Von Jan Van Eyck Bis Memling", 1906
