= Bruno Kurz =

German painter (born 1957)

- Born: Langenargen, Baden-Württemberg
- Education: Staatliche Akademie der Bildenden Künste Karlsruhe, Staatliche Akademie der Bildenden Künste Stuttgart
- Known for: Painting
- Movement: Colour fields

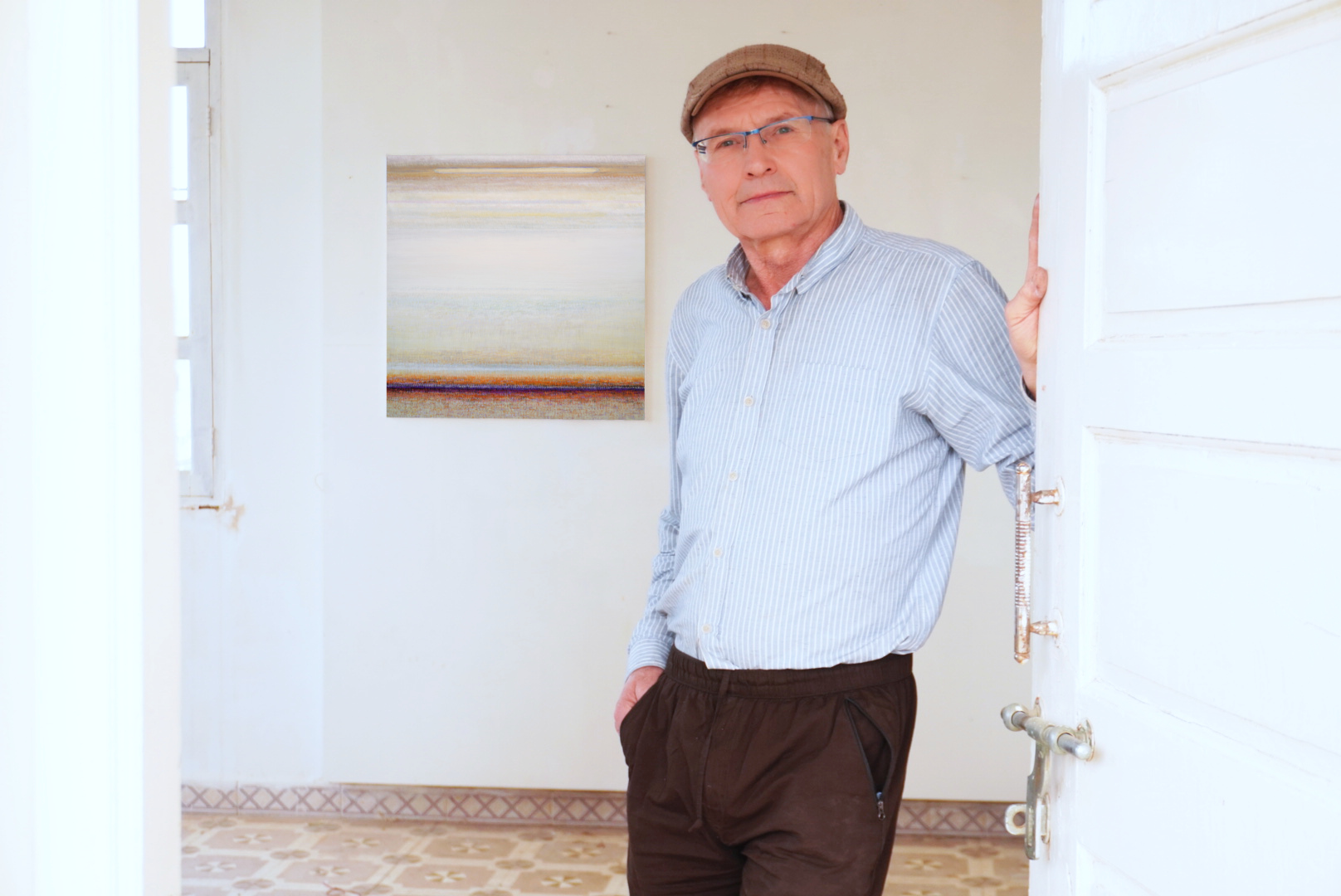
Bruno Kurz (2024)

Bruno Kurz (born 1957 in Langenargen at Lake Constance) is a German painter. He primarily works on reflective surfaces such as metal, creating paintings of great luminosity and depth – expansive colour fields with vague allusions to landscape and flora. Apart from painting, his work comprises large art installations fashioned through light.

== Biography ==
Bruno Kurz spent his childhood in Kressbronn am Bodensee (Lake Constance). He is the oldest son of Rupert Kurz (1933–2023), a metal worker, and his late wife Gertrud Kurz (1934–2007). During his secondary education at the Knaben-Realschule (all-boys secondary modern) Lindau, Bruno Kurz was introduced to oil painting by his mathematics teacher. After finishing his Abitur (German university entrance qualification) at the Technisches Gymnasium (comparable to grammar school) in Friedrichshafen, he started an engineering degree, which was disrupted by being called up for Zivildienst (compulsory paid community work as an alternative to military service).

Subsequently, he did a year's travel, going by ship to Israel and Rhodes, where he created his first group of paintings and finally decided to study painting. After his return, Kurz studied at the Freie Kunstschule (Free Art School) Stuttgart under Gerd Neisser (1980–81) and at the Staatliche Akademie der Bildenden Künste Karlsruhe (Karlsruhe Academy of Fine Arts) under Per Kirkeby and Max G. Kaminski (1981–86).

Bruno Kurz has been concerned with particular aspects of light and colour since his youth. While still studying, he undertook extensive travels to Southern Europe and India (1983/84 and 1986/87), later to Mexico and Canada. The experience of nature and new realms of colour and light led to numerous experiments with painting surfaces and colour substances, and major work cycles evolved. A project grant on the theme of "Heimat" enabled his first journey to Northern Europe in 1998, where he visited the Outer Hebrides, the Orkney Islands, the Scottish Highlands and Bergen in Norway. Celtic symbols and their typical merging of circle and cross, Irish-Scottish monasticism and its connections with the Lake Constance region, together with impressions of nature, formed the basis for a large project-related exhibition in his home town Kressbronn am Bodensee, featuring expansive installations.

"What's important is, that an artist just like our 20th century Canadian painters, goes north in search of the light and in search of interesting themes. Everyone knows that the northern artists went south for discovering the light. The best example of that is Provence. But here we have an artist who goes north because the light is just as beautiful, strong and pure. So Bruno Kurz comes along in the depths of winter and goes round the Hebrides in his kayak and is impressed by what he sees. Without any photos, of course, he goes back to his studio, and paints with a good distance, this distance that is so important for painters so they are not overwhelmed by nature, but have had time and space to absorb and process it."

From 2000 onwards, such experiences of landscape affected a new series of pictures: Over ten years, he worked on his Hebrides Cycle, where, for the first time, the horizontal layers of delicate colour fields emerged that characterise his work; they would become a core aspect of his painting practice up to 2020.

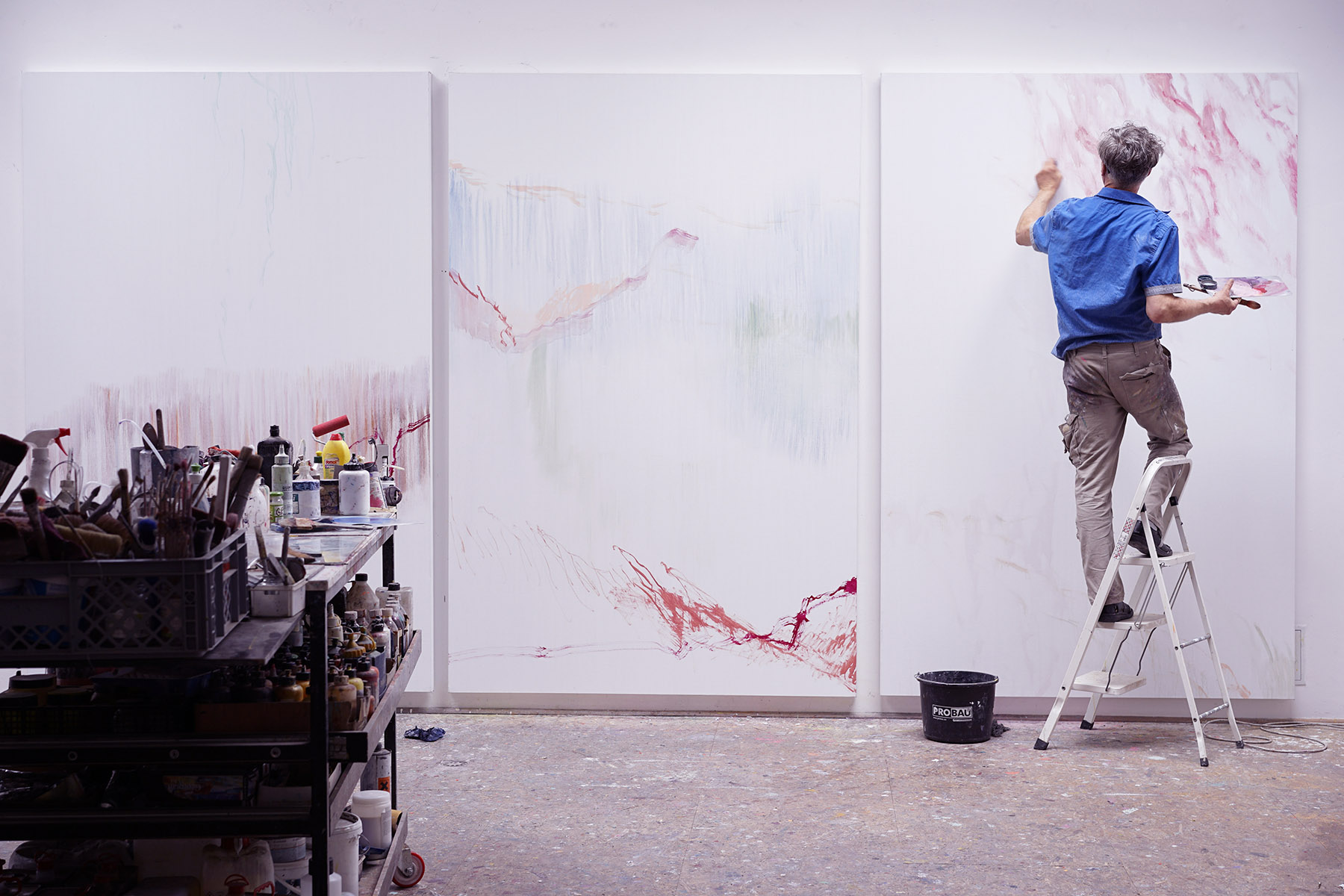
Bruno Kurz in his studio, 2022

Since then, his practice has been changing. The previously meditative mood of his paintings has given way to expressive gestures and disturbances. The ephemeral, the transient and the conveyance of landscape as manifestation and interplay of elementary forces become increasingly apparent.

Bruno Kurz lives and works in Karlsruhe and India. He shows his work in one-person and group exhibitions in galleries in Germany, Canada and Switzerland and has solo presentations at international art fairs.

== Awards ==
- 1986 Project grant, Stiftung Kunstfonds (Art Funds Trust) Bonn
- 1988–1989 Bursary Kunststiftung (Arts Foundation) Baden-Württemberg
- 1992–1993 Postgraduate studies: Interdisciplinary Media, Staatliche Akademie der Bildenden Künste Stuttgart (Stuttgart Academy of Fine Arts)
- 1998 Travel bursary to Northern Europe for the project Heimat
- 2006 Project grant, Kunst- und Kulturstiftung Deutschland (Foundation for Arts and Culture Germany)

== Installations ==
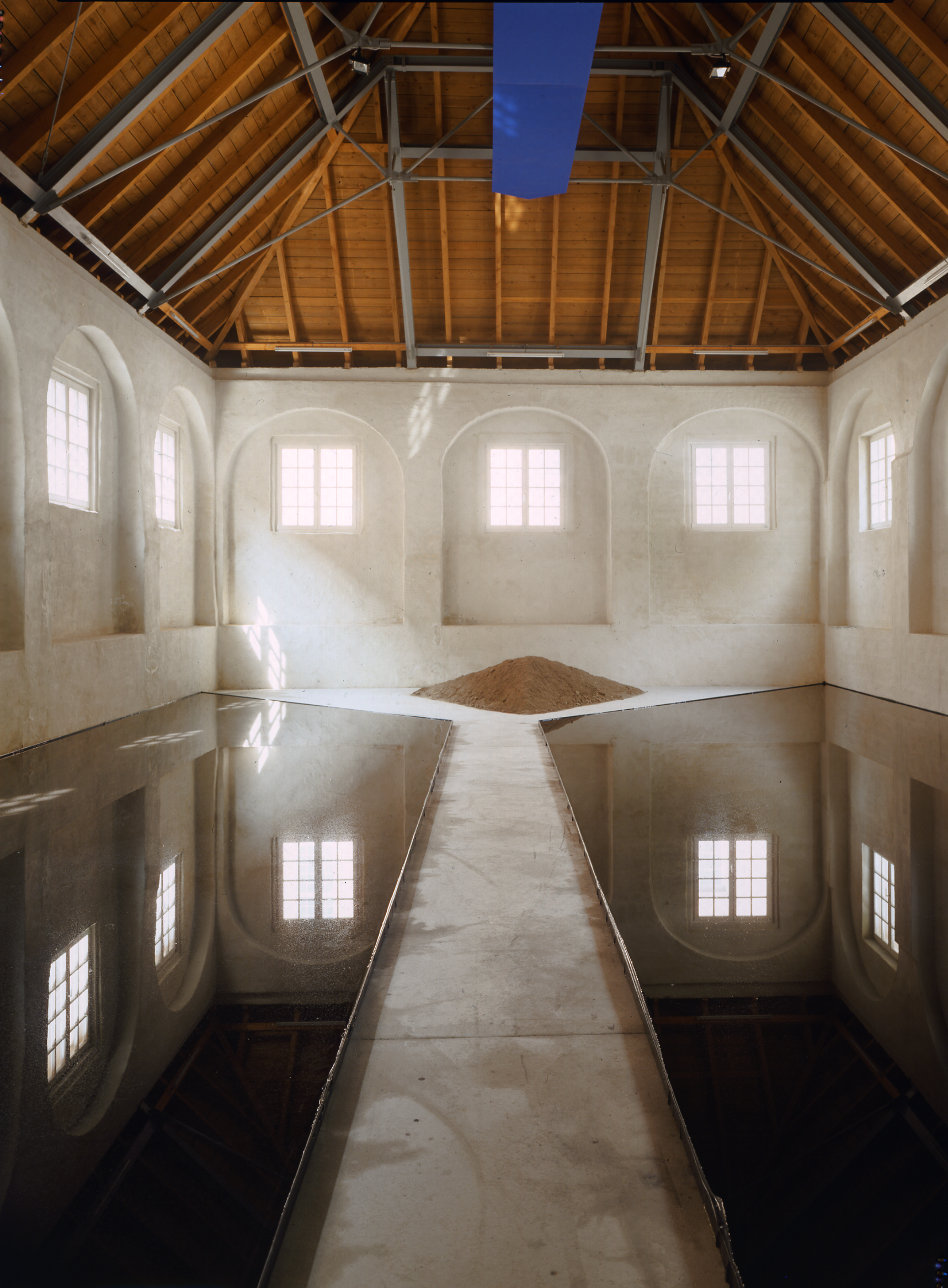
For a blue waterlily (female side), Marstall, Schloss Rastatt, 1996

Bruno Kurz obtained his first studio on the premises of the IWKA (Industriewerke-Karlsruhe-Augsburg) in Karlsruhe in 1986. With Georg Schalla, he founded the artists' group KUNSTRAUM IWKA and campaigned for the preservation of the huge industrial buildings on the premises. He co-organised a series of exhibitions titled Letzte Arbeitsberichte IWKA I and II, which was vital for saving the building Hallenbau A, now Zentrum für Kunst und Medien, ZKM (Center for Art and Media Karlsruhe).

Yet the artists could not ultimately prevent the destruction of the other buildings and the sale of the estate – in December 1986, the Karlsruhe City Council authorised the premises to be demolished, including the enormous art installations in the industrial buildings. For their Gesamtkunstwerk (total work of art) KUNSTRAUM IWKA, the artists' group were awarded a project grant by the Kunstfond (Arts Fund) Bonn, which entailed a documentary exhibition in Bonn.

Bruno Kurz created large-scale art installations in his first studio on the IWKA premises. He wanted to generate an adequate counterbalance to the colossal industrial building through large-scale artworks and installed huge geometric sculptures of plastic sheeting that reflected the sunlight coming through the sawtooth roof (Installation Kunstraum IWKA, 1987): "Rain water puddles caused by the leaking roof cast back vast reflections and gave the artist further stimuli for his work. In 1988, for the first time, he used water as a sculptural material in space. The clarity of the installations he has since created is a result of these early architectural-monumental experiences of space. Further down the line, he created his spectacular installation 'aller Farben bloß' in the baroque halls of the Ettlinger Schloss (Ettlingen Palace)."

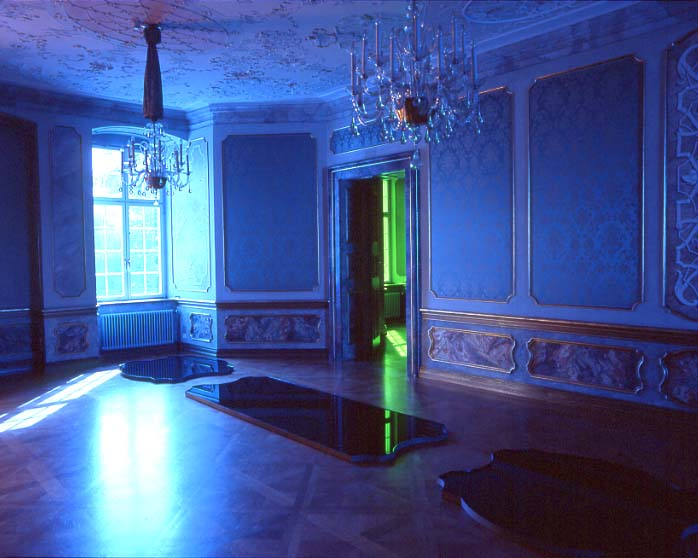
Blue Salon with entrance to the Green Salon, Ettlinger Schloss (Ettlingen Palace), 2003

Taking inspiration from the monikers "Green, Blue and Red Salon" and their corresponding tapestries, he installed coloured plastic film in the windows of the halls and created a sequence of coloured light. Notwithstanding the wide range of artistic possibilities offered by three-dimensional space, the formal, aesthetic and conceptual means of his installations clearly relate to his painting practice.

== Public art commissions ==
- 2004 Redesign of the originally baroque main hall of Palais Bretzenheim Mannheim, reclaiming the original spatial dimensions by taking out a suspended ceiling constructed in the 1950s (Commissioned by Land (State) Baden-Württemberg, Staatl. Vermögensamt (State Finance Office) and Hochbauamt (Public Works Service) Mannheim)
- 2004 Design of the front of the courtroom of the Verwaltungsgerichtshof (Higher Administrative Court) Baden-Württemberg in Mannheim (Commissioned by Land Baden-Württemberg, Oberfinanzdirektion (Regional Tax Office) Stuttgart)
- 2004 Universität Freiburg (University), Klinikum (Clinical centre); shortlisted

== Abstract landscape painting ==
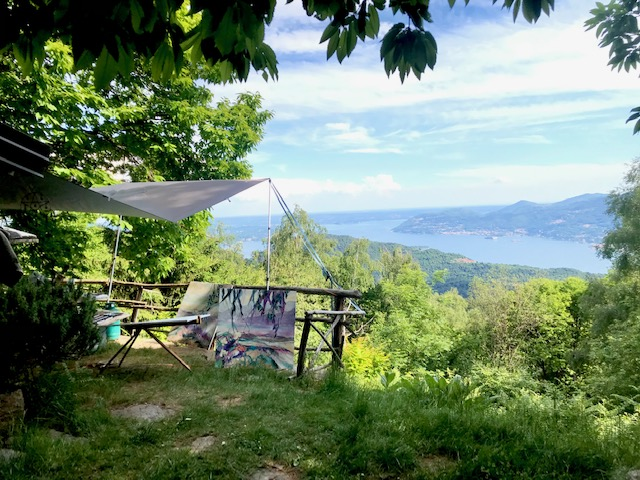
En Plein Air Atelier (Open air studio), Lago Maggiore, 2022

Time and again, the painter leaves his studio in the “Blue House” in Karlsruhe South to embark on extensive journeys to encounter unknown landscapes and to find new experiences and inspirations. In particular, time spent in Greenland, Iceland, Andalucia and Greece (2021), and an artist's residency at Casa Tagumerche on La Gomera (2021), have had a significant impact on his work. He also paints regularly in an “En Plein Air Atelier” (open air studio) in the mountains above Lago Maggiore and in India.

In his work, he adheres to the principles of composition in classic landscape painting, yet at the same time, he counteracts this by using the square format. Since Kazimir Malevich, the square is considered the absolute form of abstract painting. Bruno Kurz uses it as the basic format of most of his paintings, which has virtually become a signature feature or quasi-trademark of his work. Whilst balancing diverging energy fields, it simultaneously lends an almost archaic force to horizons and directional shifts. Over the years, the cross has been added as a subcutaneous structure. This primaeval formal element from art history and symbol of unified extremes gives many of his pictures a near-sacral serenity, depth and order.

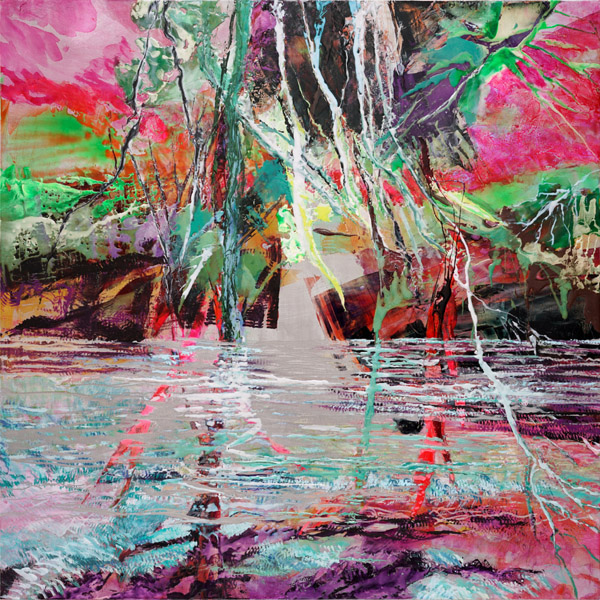
Nach dem Grünen 1 (After the green 1), 2022

Since 2018, vertical and diagonal, sometimes plant-, flame- or torrent-like colour dynamics have increasingly come to the fore, ripping open or overlaying horizons; things are becoming more permeable, linear and airy, but also wilder and more representational. No form, colour or brushstroke dominates another one. Where dynamics surge towards an explosive crescendo, they simultaneously give scope for something indefinably delicate, for things evolving. Thus, apparent emptiness can take centre stage.

== Colour, material and light ==
To this day, Bruno Kurz's work is concerned with the three core aspects of painting, i.e. colour, material and light, as well as their interplay. This includes an ongoing engagement with the possibilities which his chosen materials, dyes and pigments offer. He merges synthetic resins, pigments, inks, water colour, acrylic and oil paints in unconventional combinations and layers of colour.

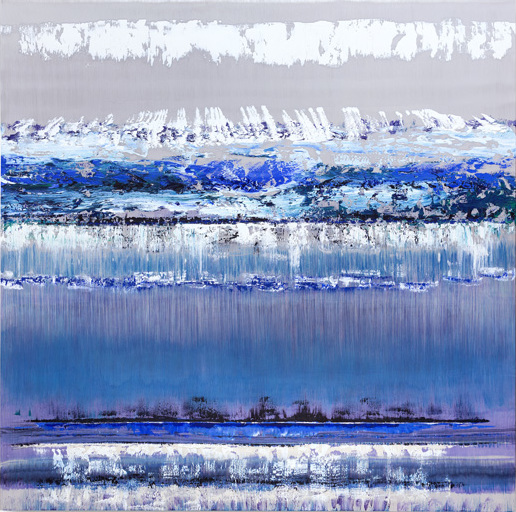
Nord-Passage (North Passage), 2016

The materials are applied in such a way that they generate perplexing visual effects, where the eye of the beholder meets extreme opposites – from glassy, translucent glazes to relief-like three-dimensional colour strips. Beneath the surface, multiple planes and layers of colour shine through, which evolve through a long process of overpainting and modifying extremely subtle textures. They seem to suspend the two-dimensionality of the paintings and lead into infinite spaces. Another essential aspect is the choice of the painting surface, which is seldom covered up completely. Over the years, Kurz has increasingly used sheet metals, modifying their surfaces with sanders. The resulting traces form the hidden basis of his paintings. As the metal absorbs colours differently, surprising chromatic effects are created.

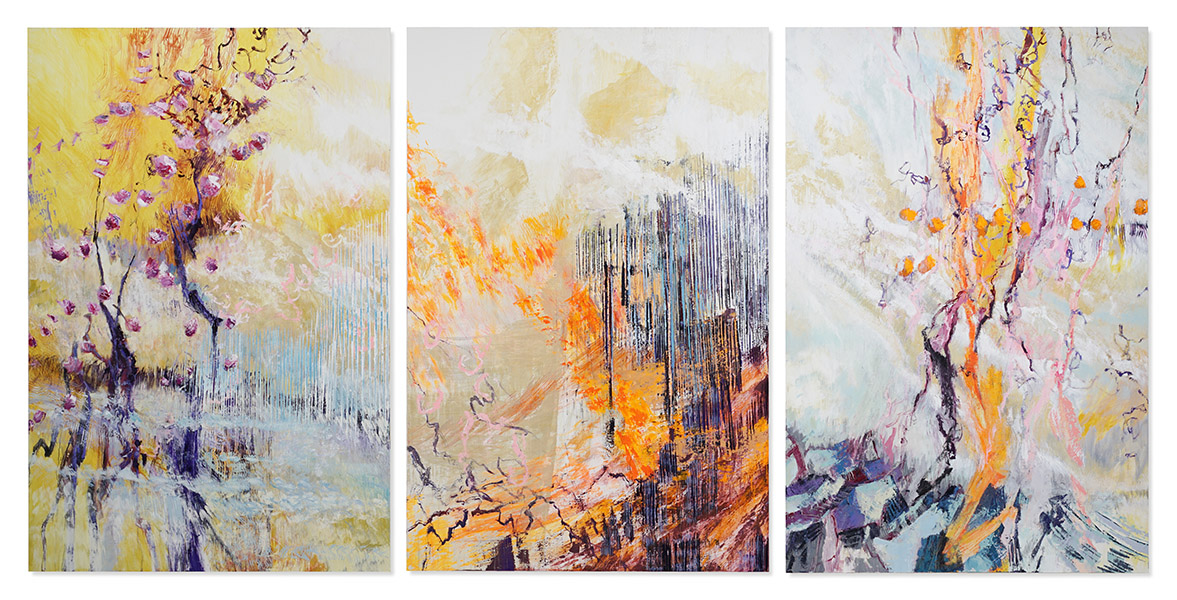
Herbstfeuer (Autumn Fire), 2021

The phenomenon of light remains the beacon that guides his oeuvre's outlook. Everything is ultimately aimed at giving light the scope to infuse material elements. Naturally, the light within his paintings correlates to the light from outside. Thus, both the direction of light and the beholder's position bring new colour fields and hues 'to light', which acquire a life of their own. "There is no such thing as the right light for my paintings", the painter points out. Even at dusk, they don't lose their power - on the contrary, they reveal new dimensions, new interactions between matter and spirit, plane and line, abundance and emptiness, weight and lightness, stasis and movement.

== Teaching ==
Apart from working as a freelance painter, Bruno Kurz also took on a variety of teaching posts in Higher Education. From 1993 to 1997, he taught Drawing at the Pädagogische Hochschule (University of Education) Karlsruhe, 2002–2008 Painting at the Europäische Kunstakademie (European Academy of Fine Arts) Trier, and 2002–2007 Experimental Painting at the Landesakademie (State Academy Schloss Rotenfels). He is also concerned with art historic analysis and with conveying the practical application of various approaches to painting to lay-persons. Since 1984 he has been part of the team of tutors at the Staatliche Kunsthalle Karlsruhe.

== Works in collections ==
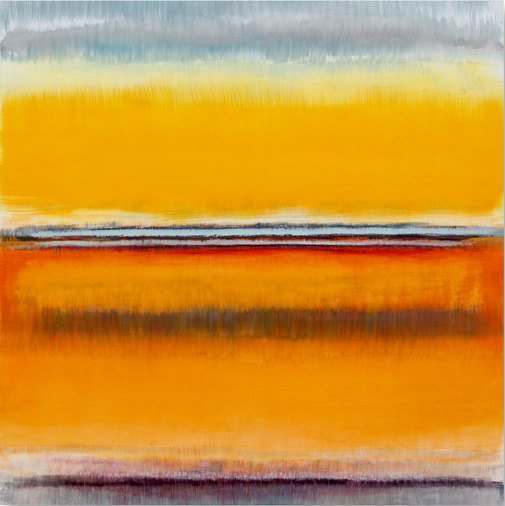
Lux, 2016

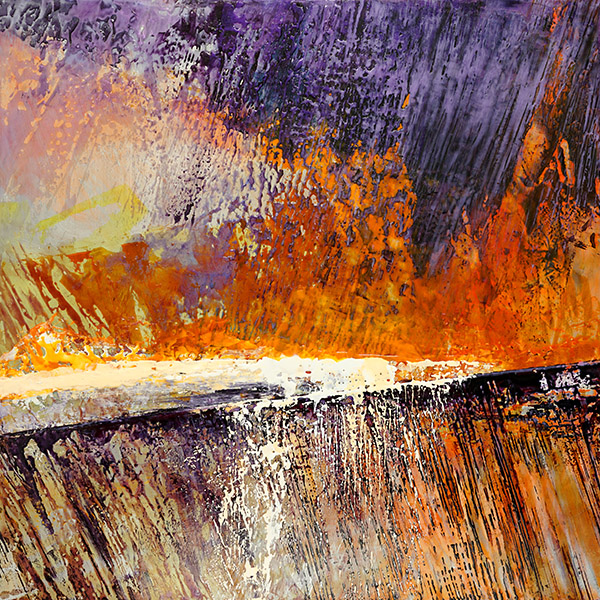
Frische Glut 1 (Fresh Embers 1), 2021

- Museum im Kleihues-Bau
- Staatliche Kunsthalle Karlsruhe (State Museum Karlsruhe)
- Städtische Galerie Karlsruhe (Municipal Gallery Karlsruhe)
- Ulmer Museum
- Sammlung (Collection) Schwäbisch Würth
- Sammlung (Collection) Gerhard Hartmann, in the Städtischen Kunstsammlung (municipal art collection) Galerie Albstadt
- Regierungspräsidium (Regional Council) Karlsruhe
- Kernforschungszentrum (Nuclear Research Centre) Karlsruhe
- Handwerkskammer (Chamber of Trades) Karlsruhe
- Bildungsakademie der Handwerkskammer (Academy of Further Education of the Chamber of Trades) Karlsruhe
- Stiftung (Foundation) S-BC-pro arte, Biberach
- Various private collections in Germany, USA, Canada and Switzerland

== Catalogues ==
- Morgenland II, catalogue of solo exhibition, pub. Kulturgemeinschaft Kressbronn am Bodensee 1992
- Kunst auf Zeit ‒ eine Recherche, pub. Künstlerhaus Berlin 1993. ISBN 3-89479-036-9
- fragments, catalogue of solo exhibition, pub. Wessenberg Galerie des Museums Konstanz and Bruno Kurz 1993
- Viermalfünf Auf Sechsmaldreai, exhibition catalogue of installation with Hubert Kaltenmark, pub. Kunsthalle Prisma, Arbon am Bodensee, Switzerland 1994
- for a blue waterlily, exhibition catalogue of installation at Kunstverein Rastatt, pub. Kunstverein Rastatt 1996
- Mannaz, exhibition catalogue of installation at Kunstraum Artaque, ed. Bruno Kurz 1998
- Bildwechsel 4, exhibition catalogue, pub. Städtische Galerie Karlsruhe 2000. ISBN 3-923344-48-1
- Das Labyrinth oder die Kunst zu Wandeln, ed. Ilse. M. Seifried, with a text by Voré, Haymonverlag (A) 2002. ISBN 3-85218-400-2
- Hebrides, catalogue of solo exhibition, Werkzyklen: BeLiv 1995–1997, Tears of God 1998–2000 und Hebrides 2001/2002, ed. Bruno Kurz, 2003. ISBN 3-925521-94-1
- Bruno Kurz – Indian diary, ein Reisetagebuch, pub. Galerie Epikur, Wuppertal 2003
- -aller Farben bloß-, exhibition catalogue of installation at Schloss Ettlingen, pub. Museum Ettlingen 2003
- Licht Passagen, catalogue of solo exhibition, pub. SüdWestGalerie, Niederalfingen/Aalen 2006. ISBN 3-937295-51-8
- Land auf, Land ab, catalogue of solo exhibition, pub. Kunsthalle Würth, Schwäbisch Hall, Verlag Swiridoff 2004. ISBN 3-89929-018-6
- Malerei des 20. Jahrhunderts, Inventory Staatliche Kunsthalle Karlsruhe, pub. Staatliche Kunsthalle Karlsruhe, ed: Siegmar Holsten, Michael Imhof Verlag, p. 219, ill. p. 220. ISBN 978-3-925212-82-6 (museum edition), ISBN 978-3-86568-671-8 (retail edition)
- TRANSLUCENT, catalogue of solo exhibition, pub. Galerie Fetzer, Sontheim Brenz 2009. ISBN 978-3-937295-98-5
- 99.9% und mehr, Künstler-Gruppenprojekte "vor" dem ZKM, exhibition catalogue, anthology, Author/pub. ZKM/ Peter Weibel (ed.), pages: 28, 37, 46, 47, 49–52, 66, 67, 70. ISBN 978-3-928201-37-7
- Lichtfänger, catalogue of solo exhibition, pub. Galerie Wesner, Konstanz 2009. ISBN 978-3-937295-99-2
- Perluceo, catalogue of solo exhibition, pub. Galerie Alfred Knecht, Karlsruhe 2009. ISBN 978-3-941850-00-2
- Translucent Horizons, catalogue of solo exhibition, pub. Odon Wagner Gallery, Toronto 2012. ISBN 978-1-927447-02-4, National Library of Canada
- Transfigured – The High Bright Night of Bruno Kurz, catalogue of solo exhibition, pub. Odon Wagner Gallery, Toronto 2014. ISBN 978-1-927447-14-7, National Library of Canada
- Begegnungen mit der Ferne, Bilder: Bruno Kurz, Skulpturen: Thomas Reifferscheid, exhibition catalogue pub. Galerie Arthea, Mannheim 2016
- Wasser, Wolken, Wind, Elementar- und Wetterphänomene in Werken der Sammlung Würth, Kunsthalle Würth, Swiridoff Verlag 2016. ISBN 978-3-89929-338-8
- Integral, The Ambient Paintings of Bruno Kurz, by Donald Brackett, catalogue of solo exhibition, pub. Odon Wagner Gallery, Toronto 2017. ISBN 978-1-927447-26-0, National Library of Canada. Online: https://web.archive.org/web/20170929003502/http://www.odonwagnergallery.com/catalog/index.php?fID=230#page/1
- Bruno Kurz, Wandering The Sublime, by Meghan O'Callaghan, catalogue of solo exhibition, Celebrating 50 Years Odon Wagner Gallery, pub. Odon Wagner Gallery, Toronto 2019. ISBN 978-1-927447-35-2, National Library of Canada. Online: https://web.archive.org/web/20170929003502/http://www.odonwagnergallery.com/catalog/index.php?fID=230#page/1
- Katharsis – Umbrüche, catalogue of presentation at art Karlsruhe 2022, ed. Bruno Kurz, Karlsruhe 2022
