= Sånga Church =

Church building in Ekerö Municipality, Stockholm County, Sweden

Coordinates: 59°21′29″N 17°42′27″E

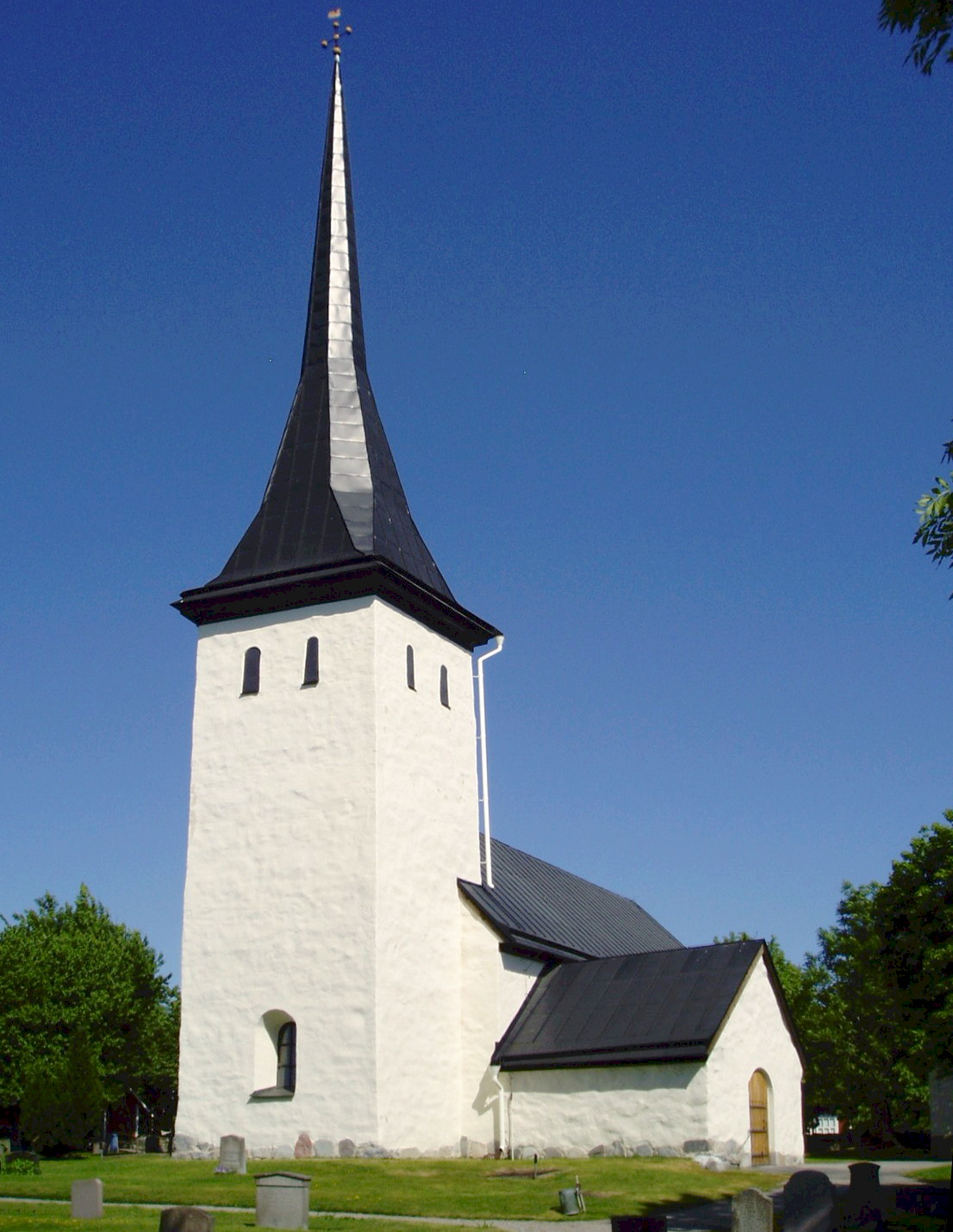
Sånga Church, external view

Sånga Church (Swedish: Sånga kyrka) is a medieval Lutheran church on Färingsö island, close to Svartsjö Palace in the Diocese of Stockholm in Stockholm County, Sweden.

== History and architecture ==
Although mentioned in written sources for the first time in 1308, the church evidently is much older, dating from the 1170s. It was expanded during the 14th and 15th centuries and transformed from a Romanesque church into a Gothic.

Both externally and internally, the church retains much of its medieval appearance. The tall spire is from 1730 but replaced an earlier spire of the same form. The church's windows have been enlarged in phases, but no other major alterations have been made to the exterior of the church. Inside, the church is decorated with a large and rich set of frescos, dating from circa 1470. The motifs are a mix of Christian, religious pictures and humorous grotesques. Among the more unusual of the frescos are depictions of the fifteen signs that forebode the Last Judgement.

Among the church furnishings, the pulpit is an unusually richly carved Baroque piece, profusely decorated with intarsia. The baptismal font, dating from the 12th century, is richly decorated, and the triumphal cross (circa 1300) also merits special mention. The altarpiece is a work by Jordan Painter. A carved wooden epitaph from 1584 is believed to contain the second oldest landscape painting in Swedish art, a few years younger than the Vädersolstavlan.
