= Julius Baum =

German art historian (1882–1959)

Julius Baum (born 9 April 1882 in Wiesbaden; died 27 October 1959 in Stuttgart) was a German and Swiss art historian, teacher and museum director.

== Life ==
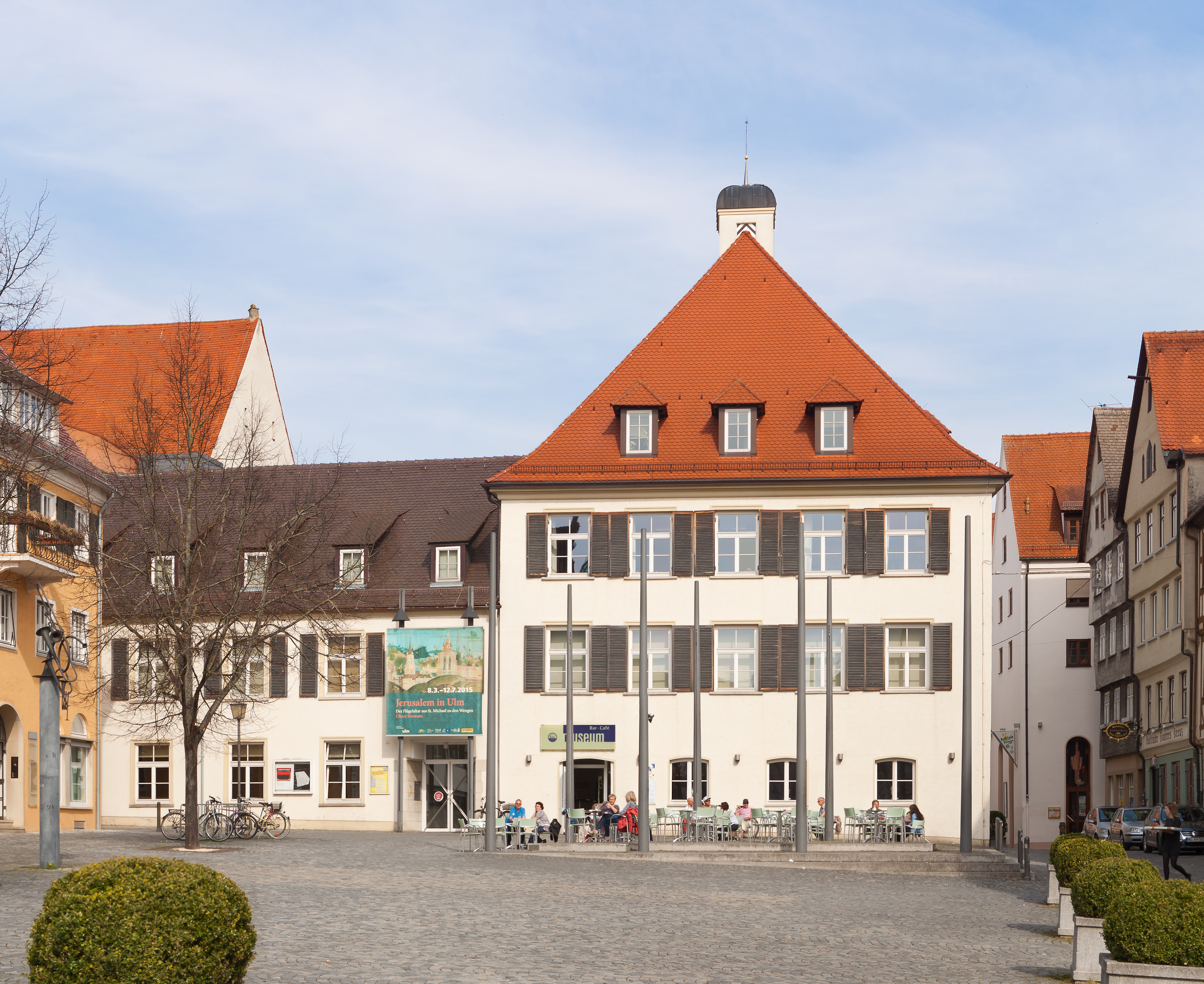
Museum Ulm (Ulmer Museum). Julius Baum was director between 1924 und 1933.

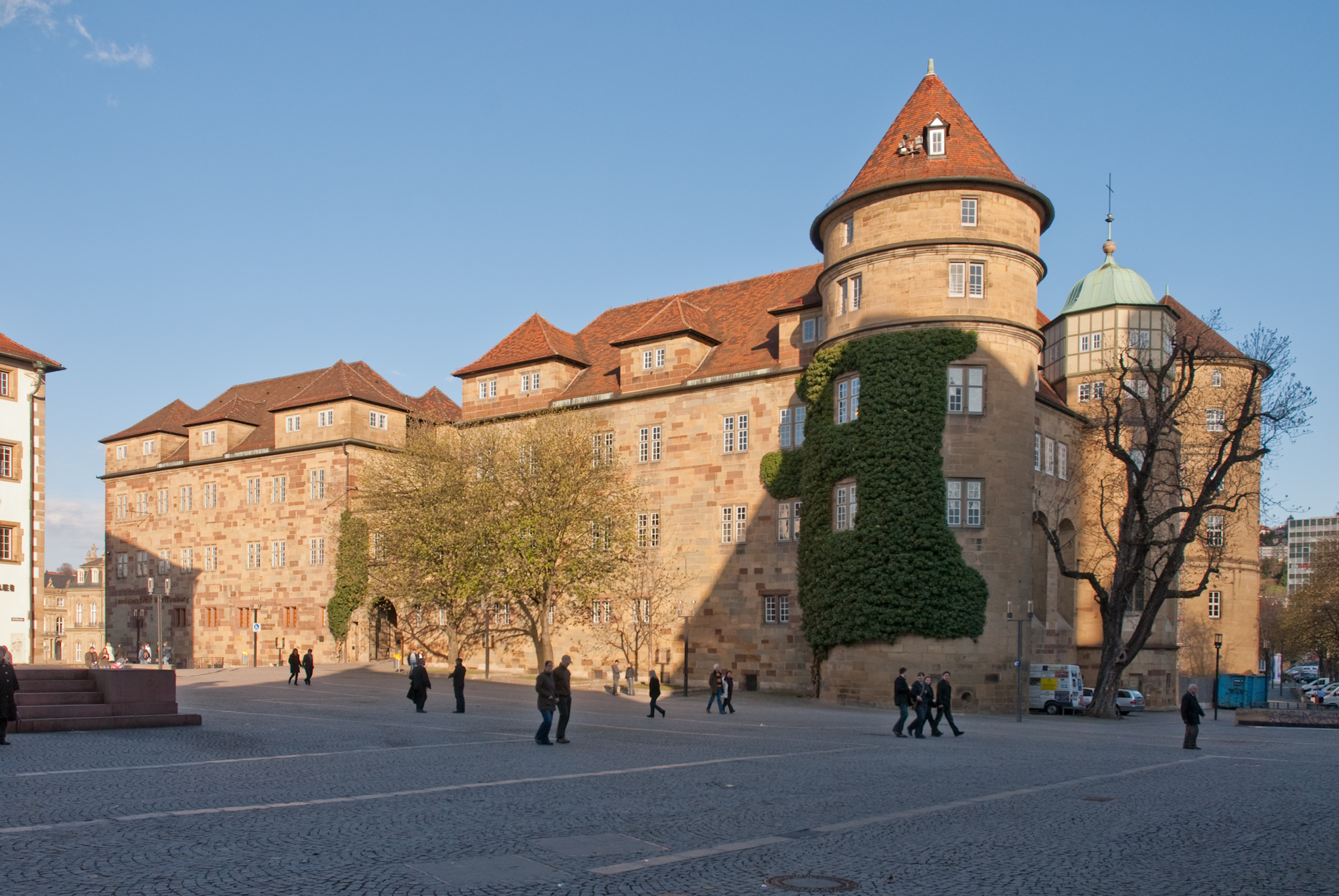
Landesmuseum Württemberg in Stuttgart. Julius Baum was director from 1947 to 1952. In 1947, it was called Württembergisches Landesmuseum.

After studying art history at the Ludwig-Maximilians-Universität München, the Friedrich Wilhelm University of Berlin and the University of Tübingen, he worked from 1908 to 1922 as an assistant and curator at the Württemberg State Museum in Stuttgart, which was then called the “State Collection for Patriotic Art and Ancient Monuments”. He completed his doctorate in 1905 at the University of Tübingen under Konrad von Lange. The dissertation was entitled “The churches of the master builder Heinrich Schickhardt”. He completed his habilitation in Stuttgart in 1912 under Heinrich Weizsäcker.

From 1911, he was a lecturer at the Stuttgart Art Academy. He took part in the First World War as a war volunteer from 1914 to 1918. From 1918 to 1933, he taught as associate professor of medieval art history at the Technical University of Stuttgart. After publishing a work on the art of Ulm in 1911, he was appointed director of Ulmer Museum in 1923. He was director of the Ulm Museum until the Nazis forced him out in 1933.

On March 18, 1933, Baum was given leave of absence with immediate effect. He received his final notice at the end of May 1933. After the Reichspogromnacht in 1938, Baum was temporarily interned in the Welzheim protective custody camp and emigrated to Bern, Switzerland in 1939.

Theodor Heuss, the then Minister of Culture in Württemberg-Baden, called him back to Stuttgart soon after the end of the war, and Baum returned home to Germany in October 1946. Julius Baum was director of the Württemberg State Museum from 1947 to 1952.

He died on October 27, 1959, and was laid to rest at his wife's family grave in Esslingen am Neckar.

In 1960, his widow Emma Baum sold his library (2,000 books) and photo library (80,000 images) to Johannes Gutenberg University in Mainz. This also included an estate of letters, which is kept in the university archives.

== Honors ==
- 1952 – Received the Order of Merit of the Federal Republic of Germany.
- 1952 – A festschrift was published in his honor in Neue Beiträge zur Archäologie und Kunstgeschichte Schwabens.

== Literature ==
- Werner R. Deusch: Nachruf Julius Baum. In: Zeitschrift für Württembergische Landesgeschichte 19 (1960), S. 184 f.
- Werner Fleischhauer: Zum Tode von Prof. Dr. Julius Baum. In: Schwäbische Heimat 11 (1960) S. 25–27.
- Werner Röder, Herbert A. Strauss (Hrsg.): Biographisches Handbuch der deutschsprachigen Emigration nach 1933. Saur, München 1980–1983, ISBN 3-598-11284-X.
- Ulrike Wendland: Biographisches Handbuch deutschsprachiger Kunsthistoriker im Exil. Leben und Werk der unter dem Nationalsozialismus verfolgten und vertriebenen Wissenschaftler. Teil 1: A–K. Saur, München 1999, ISBN 3-598-11339-0, S. 27–31.
- Myrah Adams: Julius Baum. Museumsdirektor zwischen Tradition und Moderne. Ulmer Museum, Ulm 2005, ISBN 3-928738-44-5.
- Baum, Julius. In: Lexikon deutsch-jüdischer Autoren. Band 1: A–Benc. Hrsg. vom Archiv Bibliographia Judaica. Saur, München 1992, ISBN 3-598-22681-0, S. 390–398.
- Reichshandbuch der deutschen Gesellschaft – Das Handbuch der Persönlichkeiten in Wort und Bild. Erster Band, Deutscher Wirtschaftsverlag, Berlin 1930, ISBN 3-598-30664-4.
- Katja Nagel: Julius Baum. In: Norbert Becker / Katja Nagel: Verfolgung und Entrechtung an der Technischen Hochschule Stuttgart während der NS-Zeit. Belser, Stuttgart 2017, S. 169–178.
