= Jordan Målare =

Swedish artist

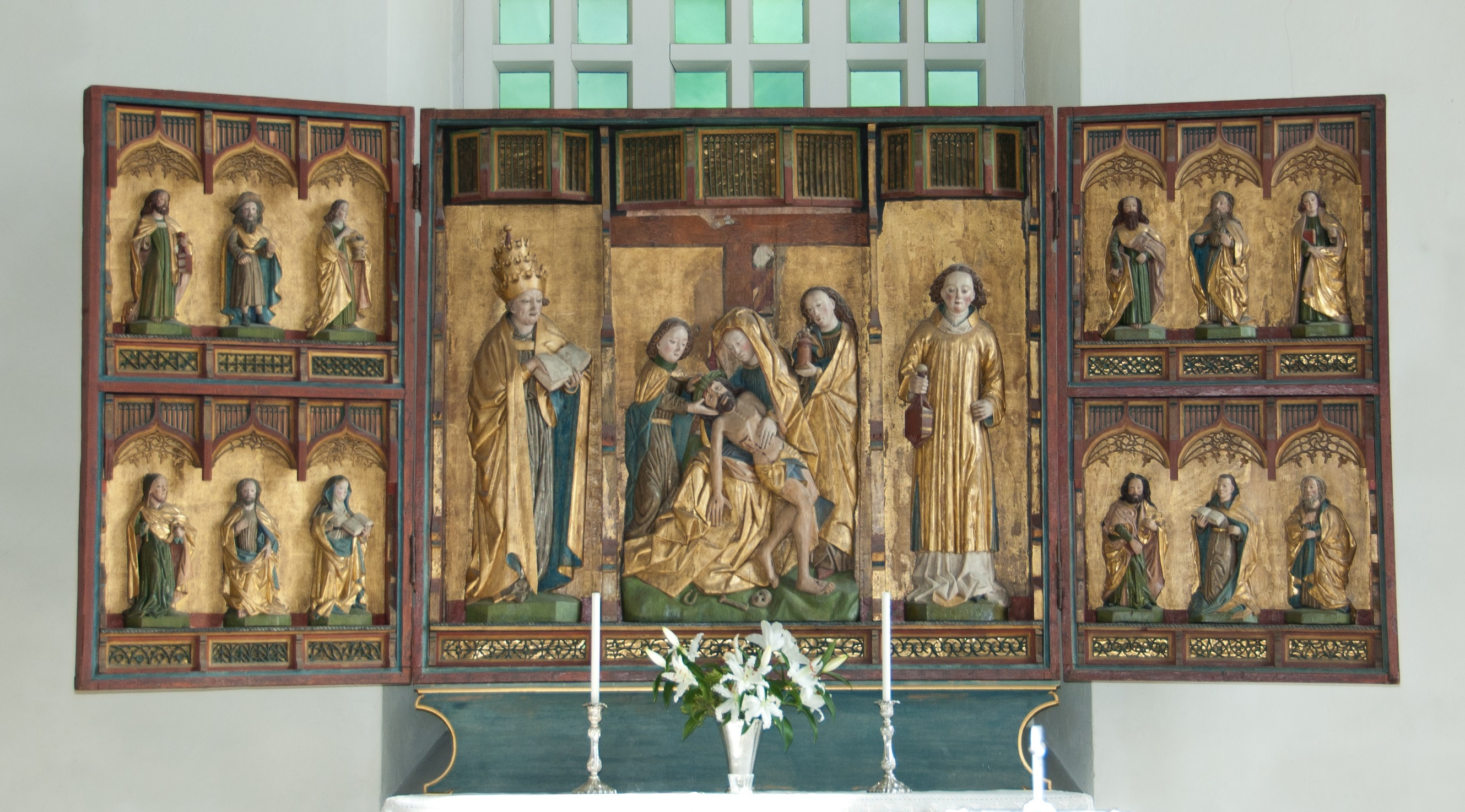
Altarpiece attributed to Jordan Painter in Bollnäs Church, Sweden

The artist known as Jordan Målare (literally, "Jordan the painter") was a Swedish artist, leader of a workshop that c. 1460 to 1470 manufactured altarpieces for several Swedish churches. In 1484 he became a burgher of Arboga. Altarpieces from his workshop exist in the churches of Sollentuna, Sånga, Ekerö, Romfartuna and Bollnäs, as well as on display in the Swedish History Museum in Stockholm.
