= Master of the Berswordt Altar =

German painter

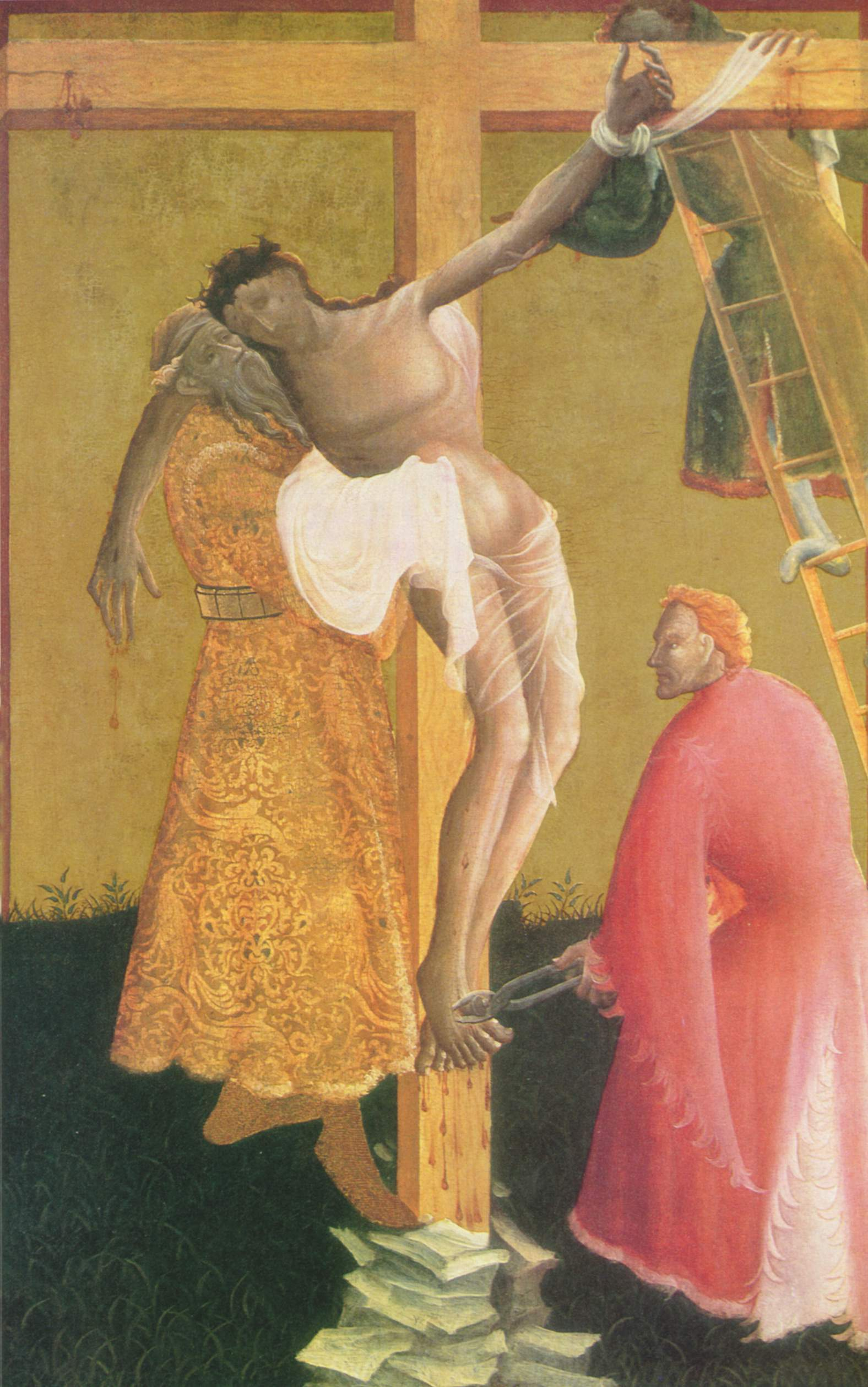
The Descent from the Cross (c. 1375–1400), 94 × 60.3 cm. Currently located in the Marienkirche, Dortmund

The Master of the Berswordt Altar (sometimes called the Master of the Crucifixion in the Marienkirche at Dortmund) was a German painter active in the area around Dortmund during the 14th and 15th centuries. A number of works around Westphalia, including one in Bielefeld, are attributed to him. His altar, which he is named after, is in the Marienkirche, Dortmund.

== Bibliography ==
- Götz J. Pfeiffer: Meister des Berswordt-Retabels. In: Allgemeines Künstlerlexikon, Bd. 88, Berlin, 2015
- Götz J. Pfeiffer: Die Malerei am Niederrhein und in Westfalen um 1400. Der Meister des Berswordt-Retabels und der Stilwandel der Zeit (= Studien zur internationalen Architektur- und Kunstgeschichte. Band 73). Imhof, Petersberg 2009 ISBN 9783865681942
- Götz J. Pfeiffer: Die Retabelkunst des Meisters des Berswordt-Retabels in Westfalen. In: Uwe Albrecht, Bernd Bünsche (ed.): Das Landkirchener Retabel im Schleswig-Holsteinischen Landesmuseum Schloß Gottorf. Retabelkunst um 1400 in Norddeutschland. Akten des internationalen Kolloquiums am 4. und 5. Oktober 2002 in Schleswig, Schloß Gottorf, pp. 98–112. Ludwig, Kiel 2008 ISBN 9783937719610
- Götz J. Pfeiffer: "… noch vorzüglicher wie die zwei weiblichen Heiligen…" Werke vom Meister des Berswordt-Retabels mit dem Wildunger Retabel im Vergleich. In: Waldeckischer Geschichtsverein (publ.): Geschichtsblätter für Waldeck. Band 96, 2008, pp. 10–31 ISSN 0342-0965
- Andrea Zupancic, Thomas Schilp (ed.): Der Berswordt-Meister und die Dortmunder Malerei um 1400. Stadtkultur im Spätmittelalter (= Veröffentlichungen des Stadtarchivs Dortmund. Band 18). Verlag für Regionalgeschichte, Bielefeld 2002 ISBN 3895344885
- Konrad Lorenz, Presbyterium der Evangelischen St.-Mariengemeinde (publ.): Die Evangelische St.-Marienkirche zu Dortmund. Evangelische St.-Mariengemeinde, Dortmund 1981 DNB 810986558, LCCN 82-166117, OCLC 174485875 (published on the occasion of the 800th anniversary)
