= Master of the Rebel Angels =

Italian painter

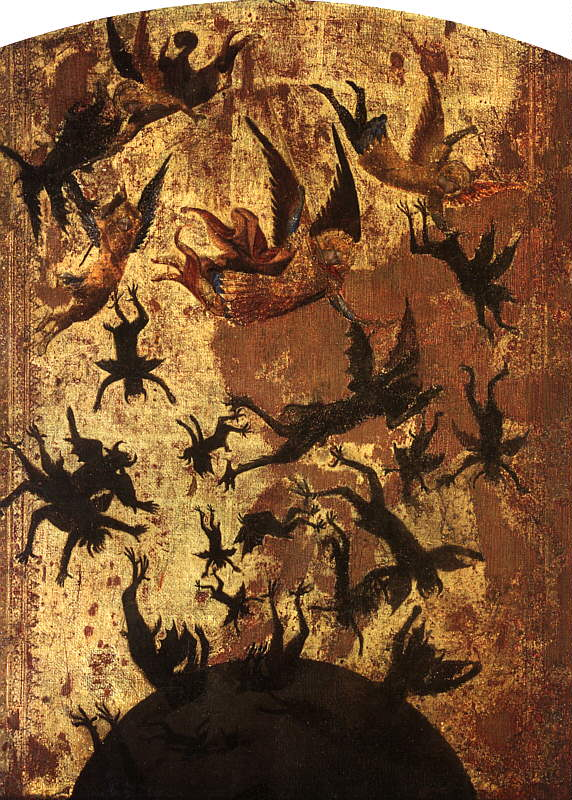
The Fall of the Rebel Angels

The Master of the Rebel Angels is an anonymous master of the Sienese School, during the second quarter of the 14th century (Trecento).

He is only known by two panels of an ancient polyptych painted between 1340 and 1345. They can be seen at the Musée du Louvre.

His name is derived from one of these panels called The Fall of the Rebel Angels. The other panel depicts Saint Martin dividing his cloak with the beggar.

The Master of the Rebel Angels had an influence on Limbourg brothers for the illuminated manuscript Les Très Riches Heures du Duc de Berry (around 1410).

== Bibliography ==
- Michel Laclotte, « Le Maître des Anges Rebelles » in Paragone, 237, 1969, pp. 3–14.
- Joseph Polzer, « The 'Master of the Rebel Angels' reconsidered » in The art bulletin, LXIII, 1981, pp. 562–584. Article JSTOR
