= Meister Hartmann =

German sculptor

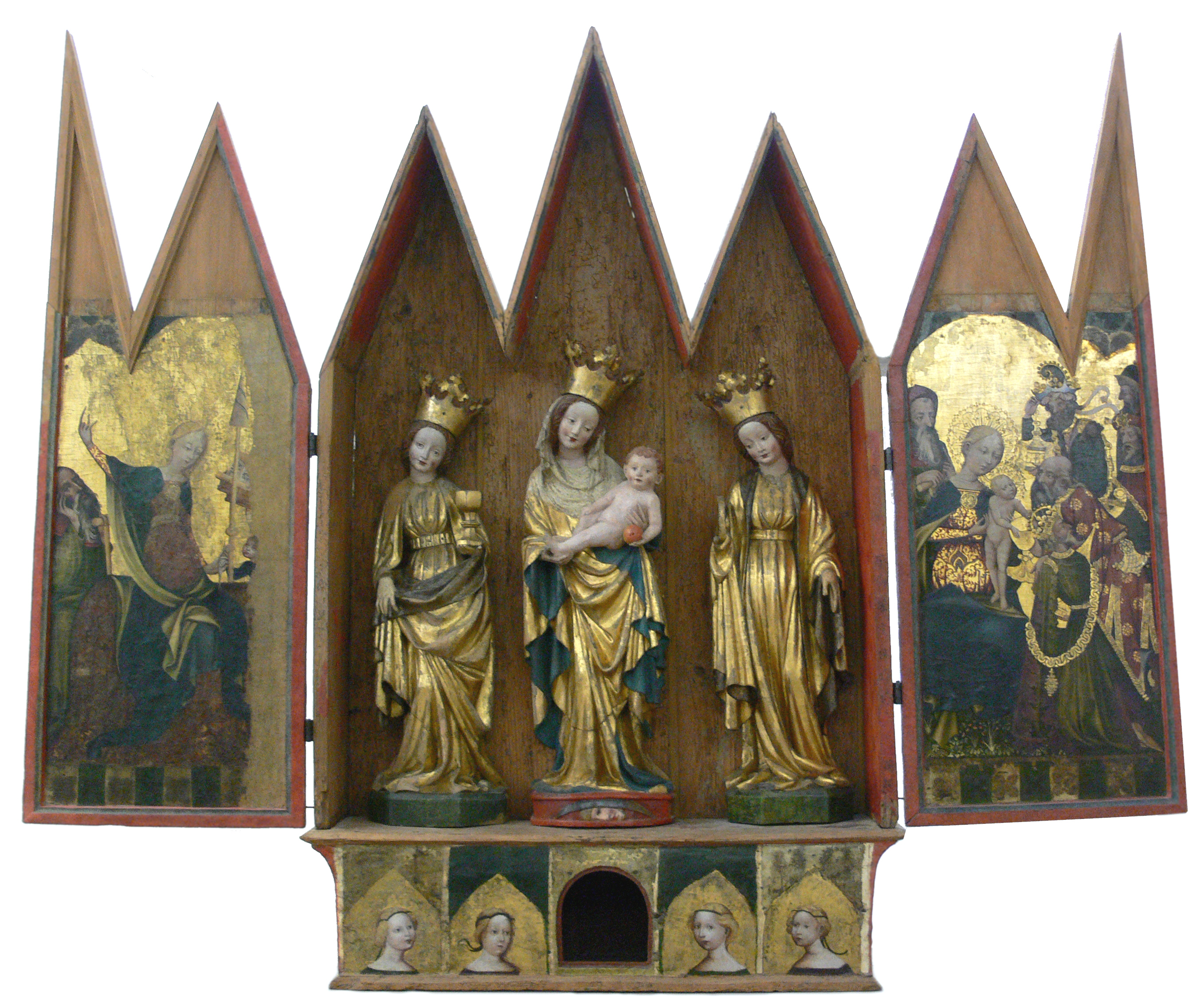
Altarpiece from Dornstadt with figures by Meister Hartmann, c. 1417. Landesmuseum Württemberg, Stuttgart

Meister Hartmann was a German sculptor active from c. 1417 to 1428, and the earliest exponent of the Ulm school.
