= Daniel Mauch =

German sculptor

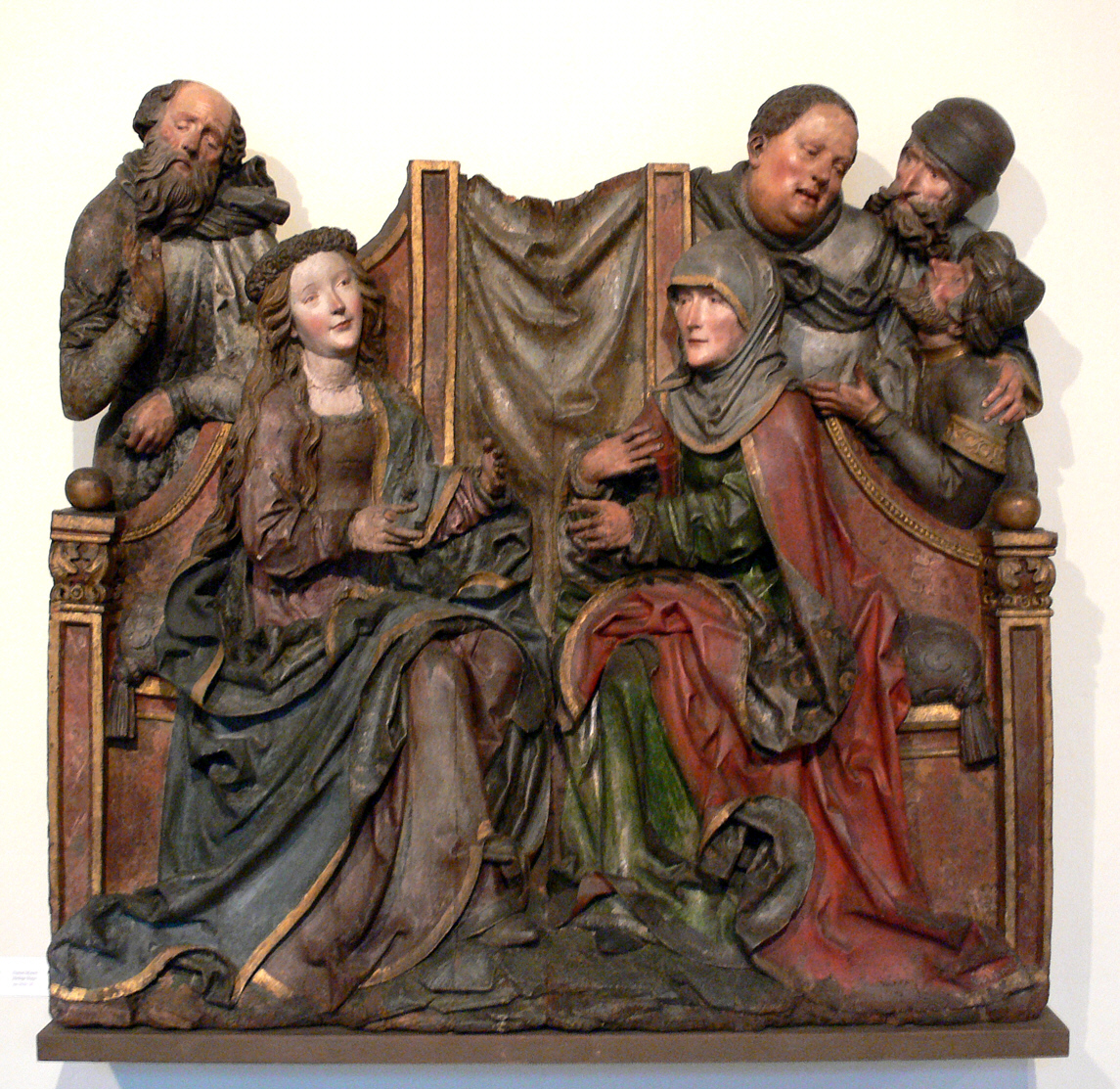
Holy Family. (c. 1510–15), Bavarian National Museum, Munich

Daniel Mauch (c. 1477–1540) was a late Gothic German sculptor. He was born in Ulm and died in Liège.
