= Jörg Syrlin the Elder =

German sculptor

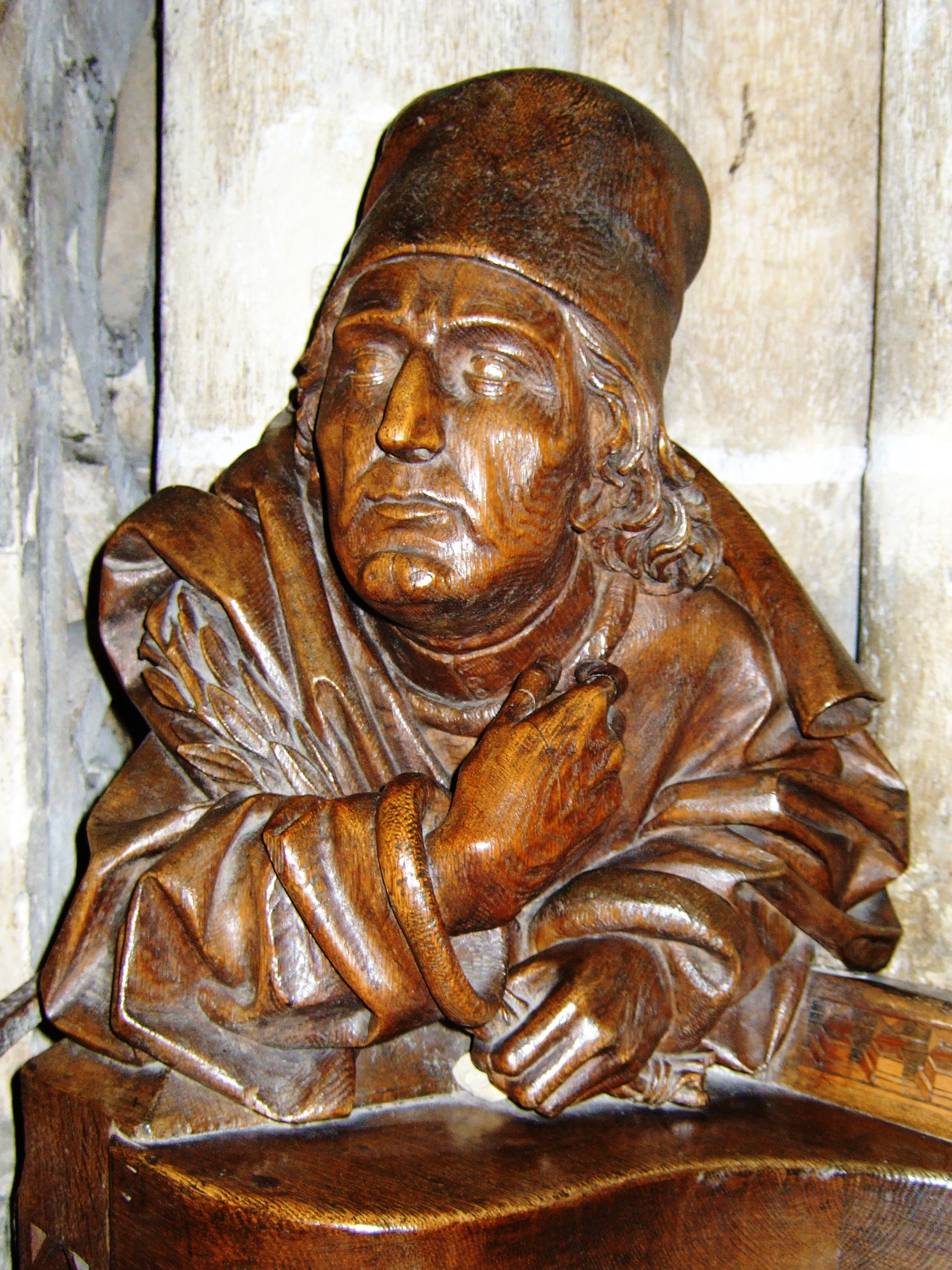
Bust of Vergil (c. 1470), Ulm Minster

Jörg Syrlin the Elder (c. 1425 in Ulm – 1491 in Ulm) was a German sculptor who is considered part of the Ulm school. After his death, his son Jörg Syrlin the Younger took over command of his workshop. His best known works are the carvings for the choir stalls of the Ulm Minster.
