= Jörg Syrlin the Younger =

German woodcarver and sculptor

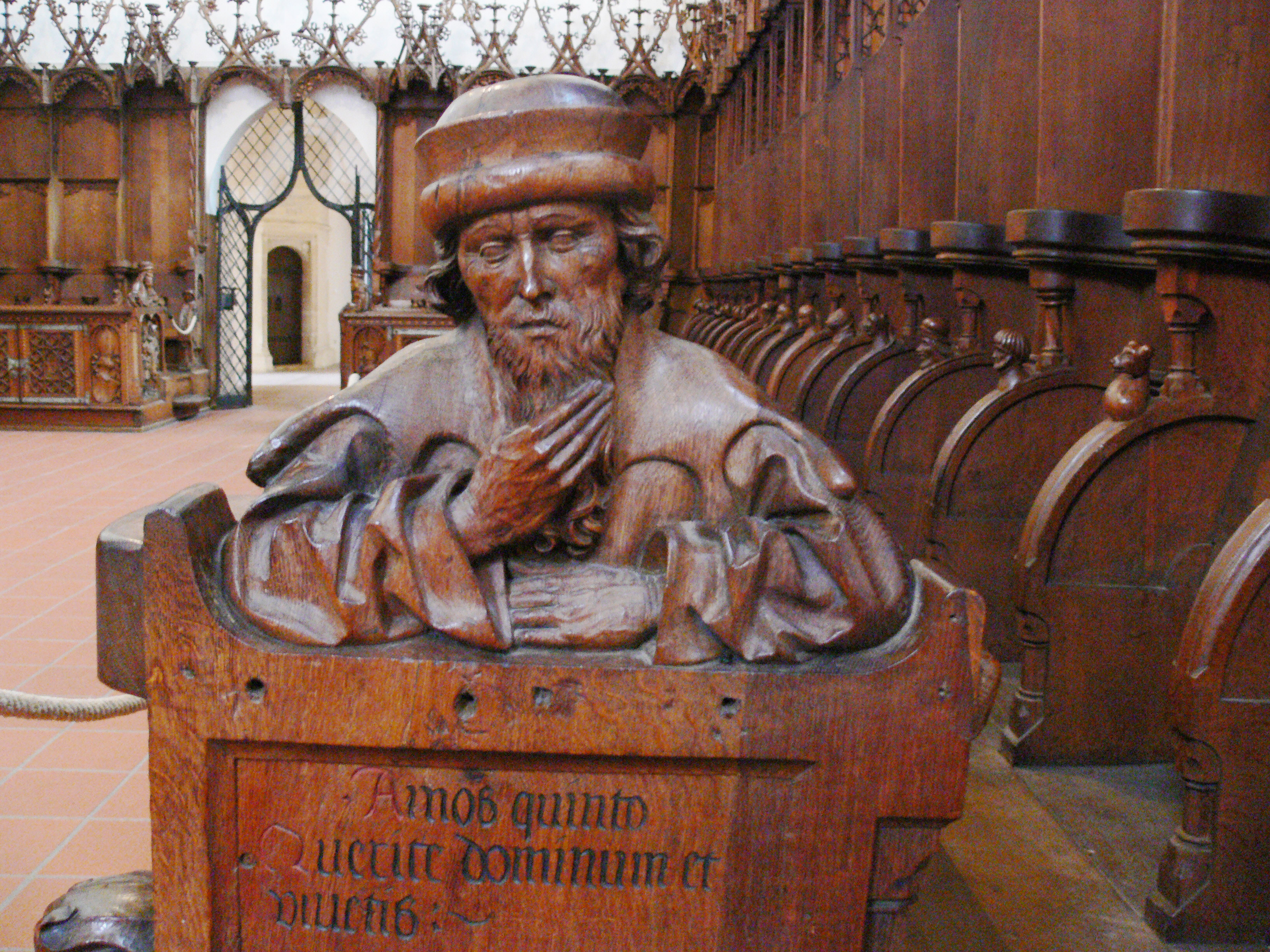
The Prophet Amos (1493), detail from the choir stall at Blaubeuren Abbey

Jörg Syrlin the Younger (c.1455–1521) was a German sculptor. He was born in Ulm, the son of Jörg Syrlin the Elder and became a member of the Ulm school.
