= Velhartice Ark =

Late Gothic altar

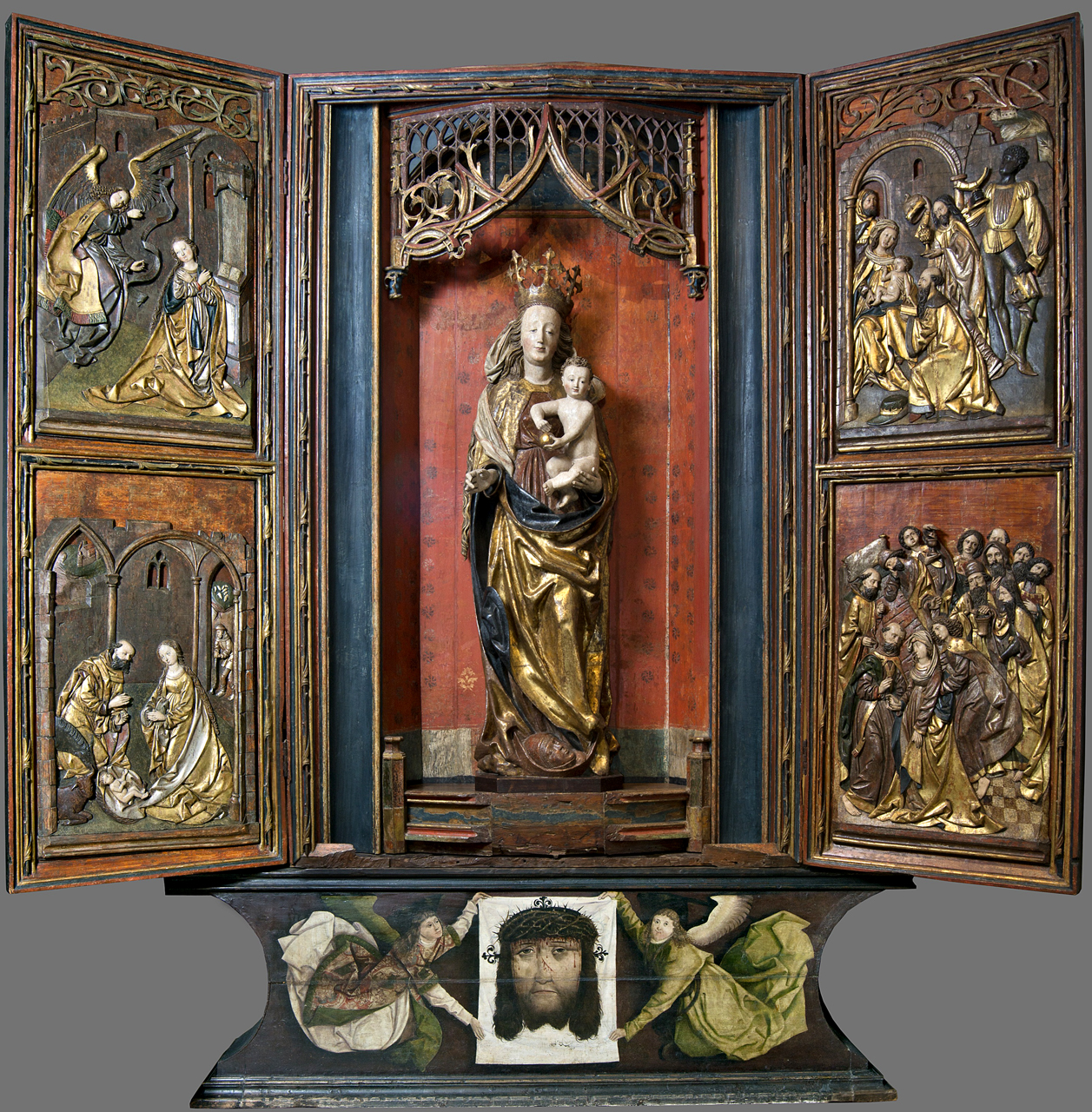
Velhartice Ark (1490-1500), National Gallery in Prague

The Velhartice Ark, dating from 1490 to 1500, is a completely preserved late-Gothic altar from Bohemia. The altar is exceptional in the quality of its carving. It was originally commissioned for the parish church of the Nativity of the Virgin Mary in Velhartice in south-west Bohemia, where it probably stood on the mensa of the main altar. It is on display in the exposition of medieval art of the National Gallery in Prague.

== Historical context ==
The altar was created in Upper Austrian workshops, which were very strongly connected with the South Bohemian artistic environment, or directly with Southwest Bohemia town Klatovy. The donor of the altar was the owner of the Velhartice estate, Wilhelm von Riesenberg.

Wilhelm's father Diepold Schwihau von Riesenberg, who descended from a side branch of the noble family Schwihau von Riesenberg (in the 14th century originally from Dolany, from the 15th century from Riesenberg), purchased Velhartice Castle in the middle of the 15th century from the lords of Hradec (Herren von Neuhaus). Diepold was the Purgrave of Prague Castle from 1445 to 1448 and after his death in 1474 he was buried in the Church of the Nativity of the Virgin Mary in Velhartice alongside his wife Katherine of Lemberk. Wilhelm von Riesenberg was the sole owner of the manor from 1487 and also an important patron of the local parish church. He died in 1505 and was buried in the same place as his parents. After him, Velhartice passed into the hands of Zdeněk Lev of Rožmitál. The origin of the Velhartice Ark is placed in the lifetime of Wilhelm von Riesenberg between 1490 and 1500.

The Velhartice Ark was moved to the Velhartice cemetery church of St. Mary Magdalene in 1772 and from there it was purchased in 1902 for the collections of the Museum of Decorative Arts in Prague. In 1949 it was first loaned and later transferred to the National Gallery in Prague. In 1975-1976 the altar was restored by Josef Kotrba.

== Description and classification ==
The altar cabinet, made of coniferous wood, has dimensions of 247 × 160 cm. The wings, with relief wood carvings on the inside and painted scenes on the back, measure 247 × 80 cm. The cabinet stands on the original painted predella (76 × 240 cm).

The iconography of the altar corresponds to the efforts to restore the Marian devotions in the Catholic environment after the Hussite Wars and depicts the life and deeds of the Virgin Mary. The centre of the altar consists of a statue of the Madonna made of polychromed lime wood. The Virgin Mary is depicted as Assumpta standing on a crescent moon and also as the crowned Queen of Heaven (originally with a scepter in her right hand). This depiction, based on medieval interpretations of the Revelation of St. John, where the Virgin Mary is identified with the Church as an apocalyptic woman triumphant over evil, was extremely popular in 15th century German sculpture.

Assumpta was seen as a glorification of the Church triumphant (Ecclesiae triumphantis). The crescent moon with a female lunar mask, which either depicts the biblical Eve or the allegory of the so-called "Frau Welt", symbolizing impermanence and worldly pleasures, is found only in Swabia, Franconia and the Upper Rhineland (central part of the main altar, Blaubeuren Monastery, Madonna in St. Nikolaus, Überlingen). It is unusual in Bohemian Gothic sculpture and indicates the artist's close relationship to the workshop of the Ulm carver Michel Erhart and his son Gregor. The drapery style of the Velhartice Madonna reveals Erhart's familiarity with the Scholastica sculpture from the Blaubeuren altar. The baby Jesus holds an apple in his hand as a symbol of Jesus' future redemption from original sin (or a sphere as a symbol of his heavenly rule). The back of the altar cabinet is decorated with stencilled cornflower motifs on a red ground.

The low polychrome and gilded reliefs of the wings depict figures set within an architectural framework and are the very fine work of another carver. In their execution they are close to the altarpiece from the castle chapel at Eggendorf (now the Oberösterreichisches Landesmuseum Linz) and it is not possible to exclude that they were made in the same workshop. On the left wing of the altar is the scene of the Annunciation and the Nativity of Jesus (according to the vision of St Brigitta of Sweden), on the right: the Adoration of the Magi, the Death of the Virgin Mary (here as the Last Prayer of the Virgin Mary). According to Albert Kutal, the connection with the Swabian sculpture of Michel Erhart's circle is obvious. The altar that Michel Erhart made around 1482 for the pilgrimage church of Our Lady in Thalkirchen may have served as a model. The compositional models were the graphic sheets of Master E. S. and Martin Schongauer. The re-gotization tendencies in the depiction are manifested by the elongation and suppressed physicality of the figures and the long arched folds of the draperies. The carving is characterized by continuous linear movement and a flat rhythmic system of lines. The style of the reliefs precedes the works of the Master of the Žebrák Lamentation of Christ.

The painted exterior of the wings, depicting scenes from the Life of the Virgin, is close to the Nuremberg painting of the workshop of Hans Traut Jr. or Monogramist RF. It is fairly traditional and uses established compositional patterns, but the whole is the result of later repainting and is of lower quality than the carvings on the front of the wings. It depicts scenes - on the left: the Presentation of the Virgin Mary to the Temple, the Flight into Egypt, on the right: the Betrothal of the Virgin Mary to Joseph, the Twelve-Year-Old Jesus in the Temple. The painter set the figures in space, which he conceived as a component artistically equivalent to figural compositions. The background of the scenes is decorated with ornaments.

On the predella, Veraikon is painted in the centre, carried by two angels. On the sides of the predella are the busts of two prophets and on the reverse two patrons of the land - Saint Wenceslas and Saint Vitus. Between them, in the centre, is an empty niche, where there was probably formerly a relief with the Pietà or Lamentation. Originally, there were also two coats of arms of the donors on the sides, which were recorded by historians Hostaš and Vaněk. The coats of arms were removed during the restoration sometime in the early 20th century. It is likely that originally the front side of the predella was a niche with the Pietà and St. Wenceslas and St. Vitus, while the Veraikon was on the back side.

The master in whose workshop the Velhartice Ark was created followed the Upper Austrian carving (Master of the Kefermarkt Altarpiece) and was influenced by his contemporary Michel Erhart. The similarities in the works of both sculptors may indicate that he came from Swabia or was still in the vicinity of Ulm in the mid-1590s. The statue of the Virgin Mary is typologically related to some South German works (Madonnas from Kaufbeuren and from Rottweil). The master of the Velhartice Ark was active in south-west Bohemia until the first quarter of the 16th century and some other sculptural works in this region are attributed to him. His influence extends to his successors, the Master of the Žebrák Lamentation of Christ and especially the Master of the Zvíkov Lamentation. In the side aisle of the Church of the Nativity of the Virgin Mary in Velhartice there was another late Gothic altar dedicated to Virgin and Child with Saint Anne in the time of Wilhelm von Riesenberg, which can be considered a direct import from Swabia.

=== Related works ===
- Madonna of Křištín
- Virgin Mary, St. Peter, St. Paul, Volenice
- Saint (St. Catherine of Siena), Prague City Museum

=== Derivative works ===
- Virgin Mary with Baby Jesus, West Bohemian Museum in Plzeň
- Madonna of Mlázov (torso)
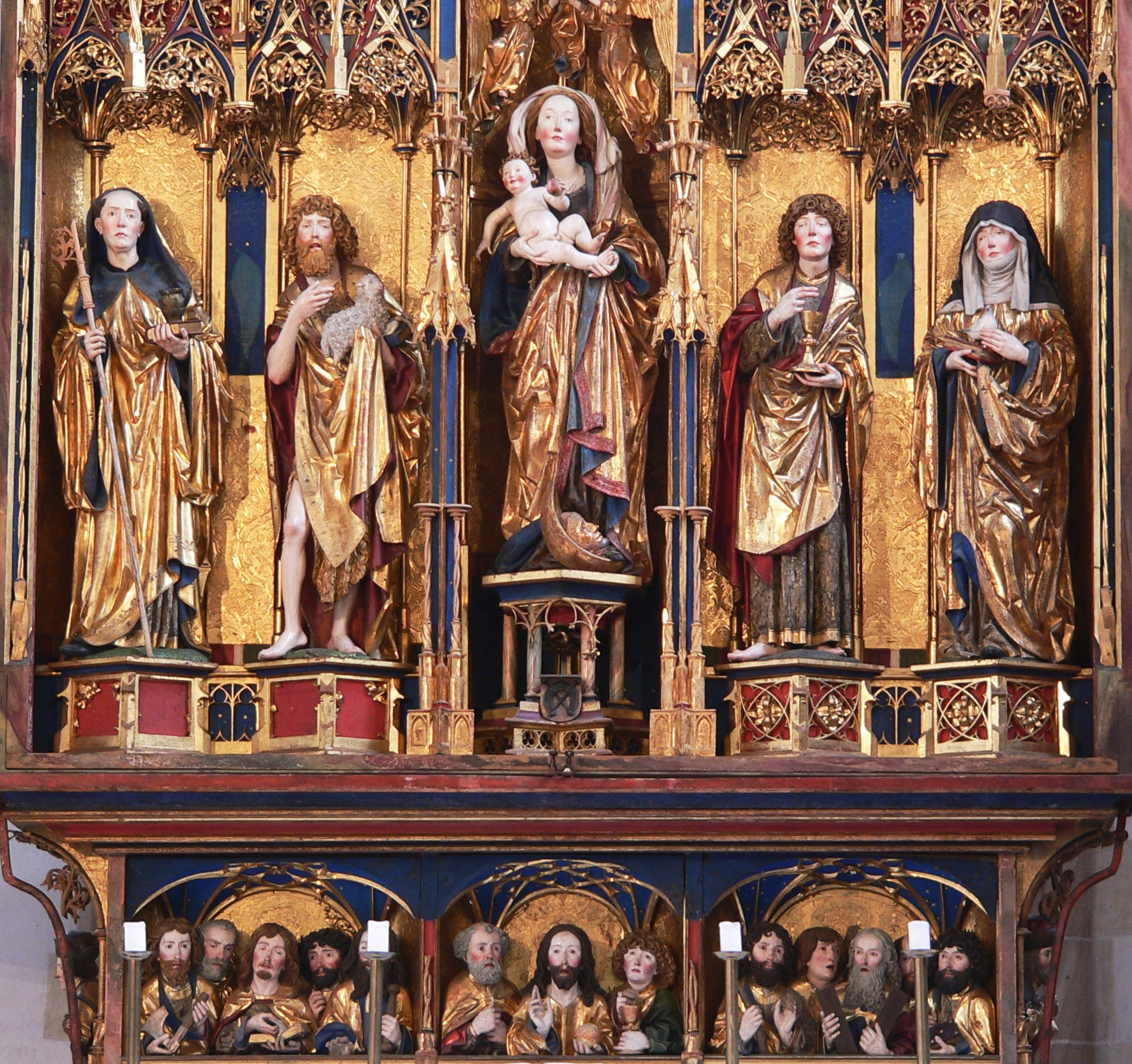
Blaubeuren-Hochaltar-Schreinfiguren (Detail)

== Sources ==
- Fajt Jiří, Chlumská Štěpánka, Bohemia and Central Europe 1200–1550, National Gallery in Prague 2014, pp. 90–92 ISBN 978-80-7035-569-5
- Jindra P, Ottová M, (ed.), Images of Beauty and Salvation, Gothic in Southwest Bohemia, Arbor Vitae, ISBN 978-80-7467-059-6 and West Bohemia Gallery in Plzeň 2013, ISBN 978-80-86415-93-2
- Peter Kováč: Vilém z Ryžmberka and the Late Gothic Ark from Velhartice, Umění, 40, 1992, no. 6, pp. 424–431; res. něm. pp. 430–431 (Vilém von Riesenberg und der spatgotische Altar von Velhartice).
- Jaromír Homolka, in: Late Gothic Art in Bohemia, Odeon Prague 1985, pp. 203–205
- Albert Kutal, Czech Gothic Art, Obelisk Prague 1972
- Albert Kutal, On the Exhibition of South Bohemian Late Gothic Art 1450–1530, Umění IV, 1966, pp. 216–229
- Jaroslav Pešina, Czech Painting of the Late Gothic and Renaissance, Prague 1950
- Josef Cibulka, Crowned Assumpta on the Crescent Moon. Proceedings For the 70th Birthday of K. B. Mádl, Prague 1929
