= Ohrazenice =

Ohrazenice may refer to places in the Czech Republic:

- Ohrazenice (Příbram District), a municipality and village in the Central Bohemian Region
- Ohrazenice (Semily District), a municipality and village in the Liberec Region
- Ohrazenice, a village and part of Jaroměřice nad Rokytnou in the Vysočina Region
- Ohrazenice, a part of Pardubice in the Pardubice Region
- Ohrazenice, a village and part of Volenice (Strakonice District) in the South Bohemian Region
