= The Holy Trinity from České Budějovice =

Sculpture

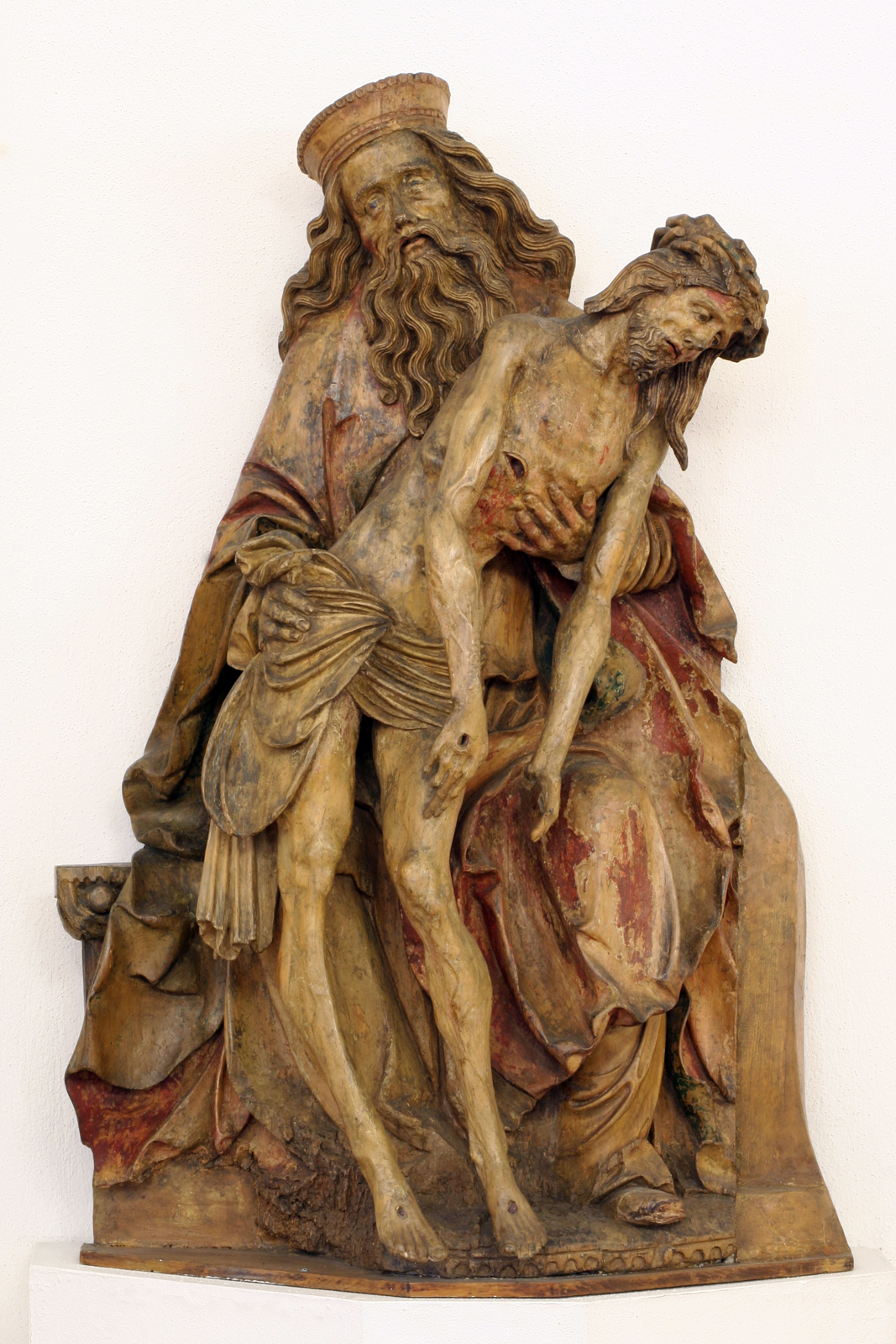
The Holy Trinity from České Budějovice (after 1512)

The sculptural group of The Holy Trinity is a work by an anonymous sculptor called the Master of the Žebrák Lamentation of Christ dating from the period after 1512. Christian Salm considers this work and others by the Master of the Žebrák Lamentation of Christ to be some of the finest Gothic sculptures of their time. The sculpture of the Holy Trinity is on display in the permanent collection of the Aleš South Bohemian Gallery in Hluboká nad Vltavou.

== History ==
The work was most probably part of the altarpiece of the Holy Trinity at the parish church of St Nicholas (first documented in 1381) or from the hospital church of the Holy Trinity (founded in 1515) in České Budějovice. Sculpture was purchased from a private collection in the 1890s for the Town Museum in České Budějovice. In 1953 it was transferred from there to the Aleš South Bohemian Gallery in Hluboká nad Vltavou.

== Description and classification ==
The lime wood sculpture, with small traces of polychromy, is 107 cm high. It was restored in 1900 (J. Wodiczka), 1960 (L. Slánská) and 1999 (Moravian Gallery). It could have been modelled on a wood-engraving by Albrecht Dürer (1511); the movement and expressive representation of Christ’s figure are worked independently and with an originality that does not have a direct model. The composition of the figures refers more to older models such as the tondo of the Pietà with the Holy Trinity (1400) by Jean Malouel and the altar wing by Bernt Notke in Lübeck (1483).

The enthroned God holds in his arms the lifeless, bent, emaciated and tortured body of Christ. He holds Christ by the chest with his left hand and his fingers reach almost as far as the wound in Christ’s side. God the Father, with long hair and a long beard, has on his head a crown adorned with two strips of dentils. He is dressed in a long cloak with remnants of red pigment and a robe that is hitched up at the waist. Jesus’s head has a crown of thorns and his eyes are half-open. His head doesn’t rest on his father’s shoulder but is turned away in order to place greater emphasis on the idea of humility. Iconographically, the scene represents the Holy Trinity as the Throne of Grace ("Gnadenstuhl"). The missing dove, a symbol of the Holy Spirit, was presumably fixed to the altar above the sculpture. The edge of the pedestal and the pillars are decorated with a frieze composed of small arches.

The figure of God the Father has a monumental and static pyramidal form, while Christ is slender and his feet hardly touch the ground. Christ’s father lifts him up and presents him as a contrast between the fragility of the divine incarnation and the inviolable deity. The sculptor thus possibly points to the notion that, in the work of salvation, the chief initiative belongs to God the Father, and that redemption, achieved through the sacrifice of Christ, is exclusively the gift of God.

Art historians beginning with Josef Opitz classify the sculpture as a work by the Master of the Lamentation from Žebrák. According to Homolka, who finds analogies with the seated figures of the altar in Altmünster, the sculptor was acquainted with Viennese sculpture (M. Tichter). He is presumed to have undertaken a journey to the Danube region in about 1511-1512. P. Kováč mentions clear analogies with Bavarian sculpture, in particular with the works of Hans Leinberger who was active during the same period.

It is possible to relate the dating of the sculpture to the founding of the hospital church of the Holy Trinity in 1515. The founding of the church followed a waves of plague epidemics of which the first, in 1495, killed almost half the town’s inhabitants.

== Related works ==
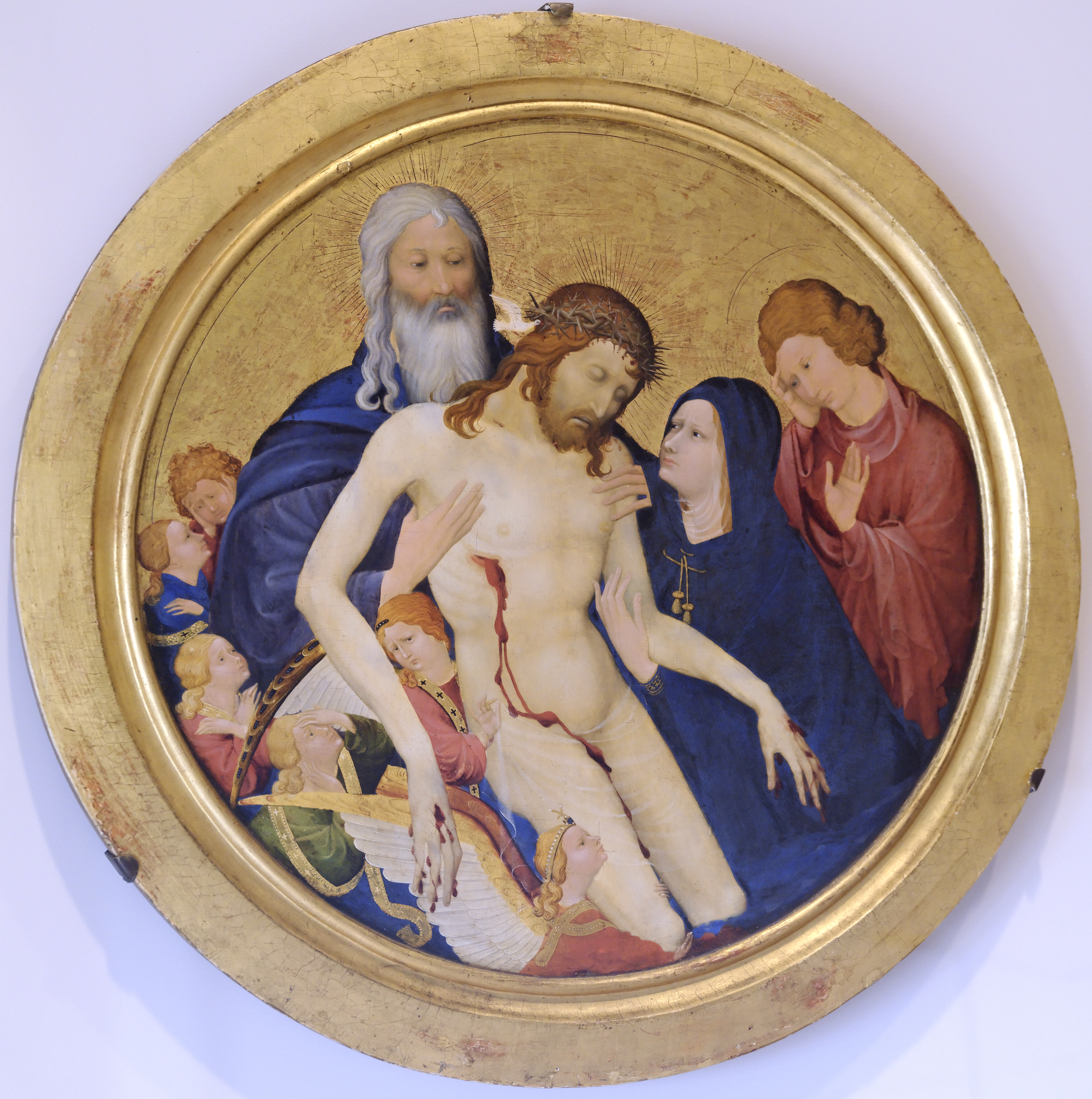
Jean Malouel, Pietà, also known as La grande Pietà ronde

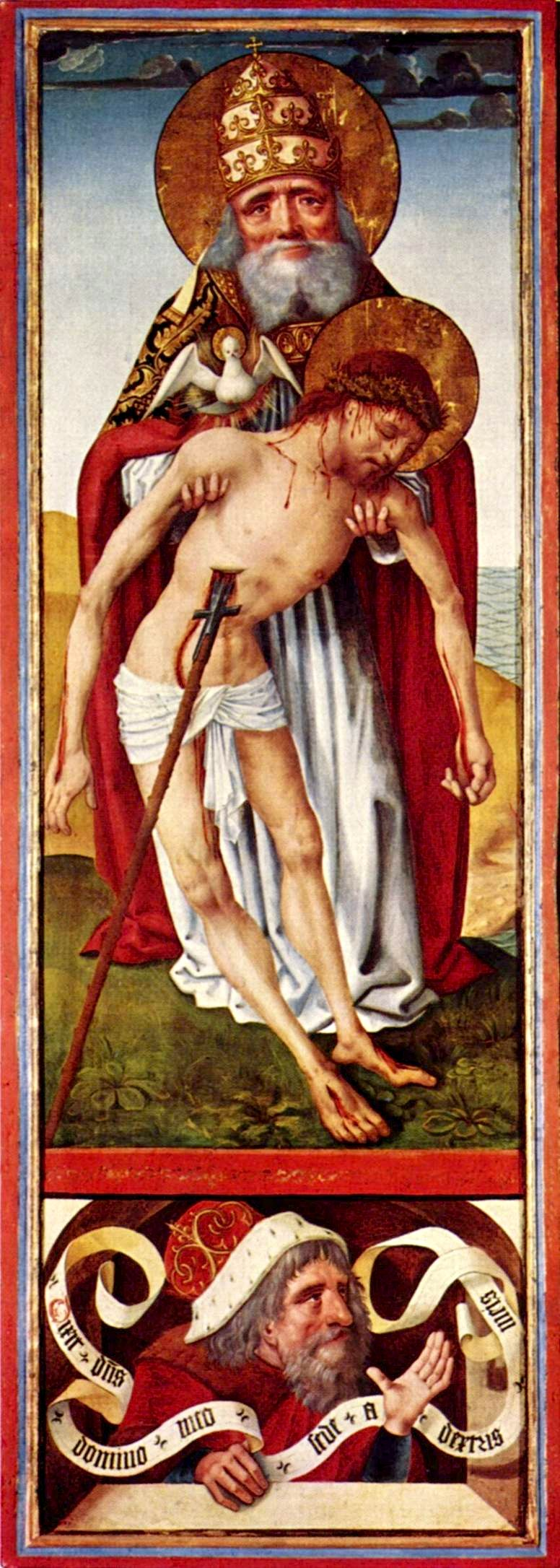
Bernt Notke, Johannesaltar der Schonenfahrer, Lübeck

== Sources ==
- Aleš South Bohemian Gallery in Hluboká nad Vltavou, inv. no. P-19
- Hynek Látal, Petra Lexová, Martin Vaněk, Meziprůzkumy, Sbírka AJG 1300-2016, č. 34, AJG Hluboká nad Vltavou 2016, ISBN 978-80-87799-52-9
- Petr Jindra, Mistr Oplakávání Krista ze Žebráka: Pietas Domini (Sv. Trojice), in: Jindra P, Ottová M, (ed.), Obrazy krásy a spásy, Gotika v jihozápadních Čechách, s.410-412, Arbor Vitae, ISBN 978-80-7467-059-6 a Západočeská galerie v Plzni 2013, ISBN 978-80-86415-93-2
- Hynek Rulíšek, Gotické umění jižních Čech, Průvodce, sv. 3, Alšova jihočeská galerie v Hluboké nad Vltavou 1989, ISBN 80-900057-6-4
- Hynek Rulíšek, Gotické umění v jižních Čechách, Národní galerie v Praze 1989, ISBN 80-7035-013-X
- Jaromír Homolka, Pozdně gotické sochařství, in: Dějiny českého výtvarného umění I/2, 1984, p. 554-555
- Christian Salm, Gotik in Böhmen, in: K. M. Swoboda ( ed.), Malerei und Plastik der Spätgotik, München 1969, p. 396.
- Jiří Kropáček, in: Katalog plastiky, Jihočeská pozdní gotika 1450-1530, s. 223-224, Alšova jihočeská galerie, Hluboká nad Vltavou 1965
- Jaromír Homolka, K restauraci některých plastik mistra zvíkovského Oplakávání, Památková péče roč. 23, 1963
- Jiří Kropáček, Ukřižovaný z bývalého dominikánského kláštera v Českých Budějovicích, Umění VIII, 1960
- Josef Opitz, Mistr reliéfu Oplakávání ze Žebráku, Dílo XXVII, 1935-1936, p. 88-91
