= Eggendorf =

Eggendorf may refer to the following places in Austria:

- Eggendorf, Lower Austria, in the district of Wiener Neustadt-Land, Lower Austria
- Eggendorf im Traunkreis, Upper Austria
- Eggendorf (Sankt Pölten), a part of Sankt Pölten, Upper Austria
- Eggendorf Castle, near Eggendorf im Traunkreis.
