= Female Saint of Homole =

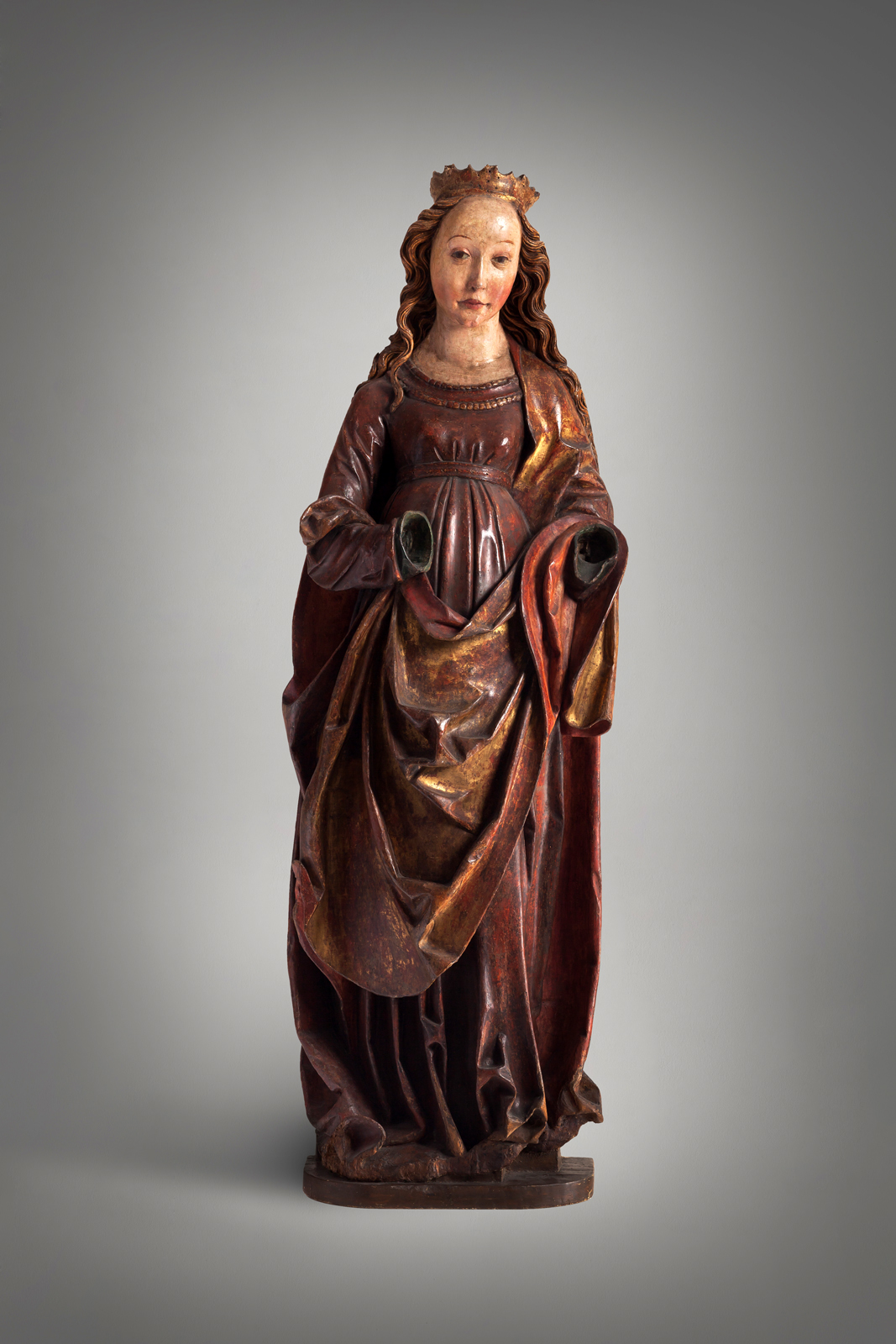
Female Saint of Homole, Aleš South Bohemian Gallery in Hluboká nad Vltavou

Female Saint of Homole is a late Gothic sculpture from the period around 1510-1515. The work is attributed to the Master of Lamentation from Zvíkov. It is on display in the permanent exhibition of the Aleš South Bohemian Gallery in Hluboká nad Vltavou.

== History ==
The statue was purchased in 1908 by the Municipal Museum in České Budějovice from a private property of Mr. Wittner in Homole. The origin is unknown. It was transferred to the collection of the Aleš South Bohemian Gallery in Hluboká nad Vltavou in 1953.

== Description and classification ==
Statue made of lime wood, hollowed out at the back, height 162 cm. The polychromy is old, probably original. Both hands are missing from the wrist as well as parts of the crown. Sculpture was restored by Ludmila Slánská (1951, 1957) and B. Slánský (1962).

The dress of the saint with long sleeves is highly belted and flows to the ground in vertical folds. Around the neckline it is edged with a border decorated with a dentil cut. The golden upper mantle with a red lining is draped over the left shoulder. Its left tip rests on both forearms and forms arched folds in front. The unusual way of folding the drapery has analogues in the stone sculpture of the 1520s in Vienna (Gravestone of Hans Rechwein von Honigstorf, Falkh's epitaph, St. Anne's altar). The oval face with its high forehead, full lips and dimpled chin has a realistic colouring. The long wavy hair is adorned with a low golden crown.

The statue was probably intended for the central part of the altar retable. Older literature placed it among the works of the Master of Lamentation of Žebrák, but it was later attributed to a younger sculptor who came out of his workshop and is provisionally referred to as the Master of Lamentation from Zvíkov. His work is related to the Austrian and Bavarian Danube and Viennese stone sculpture.

=== Details and related works ===
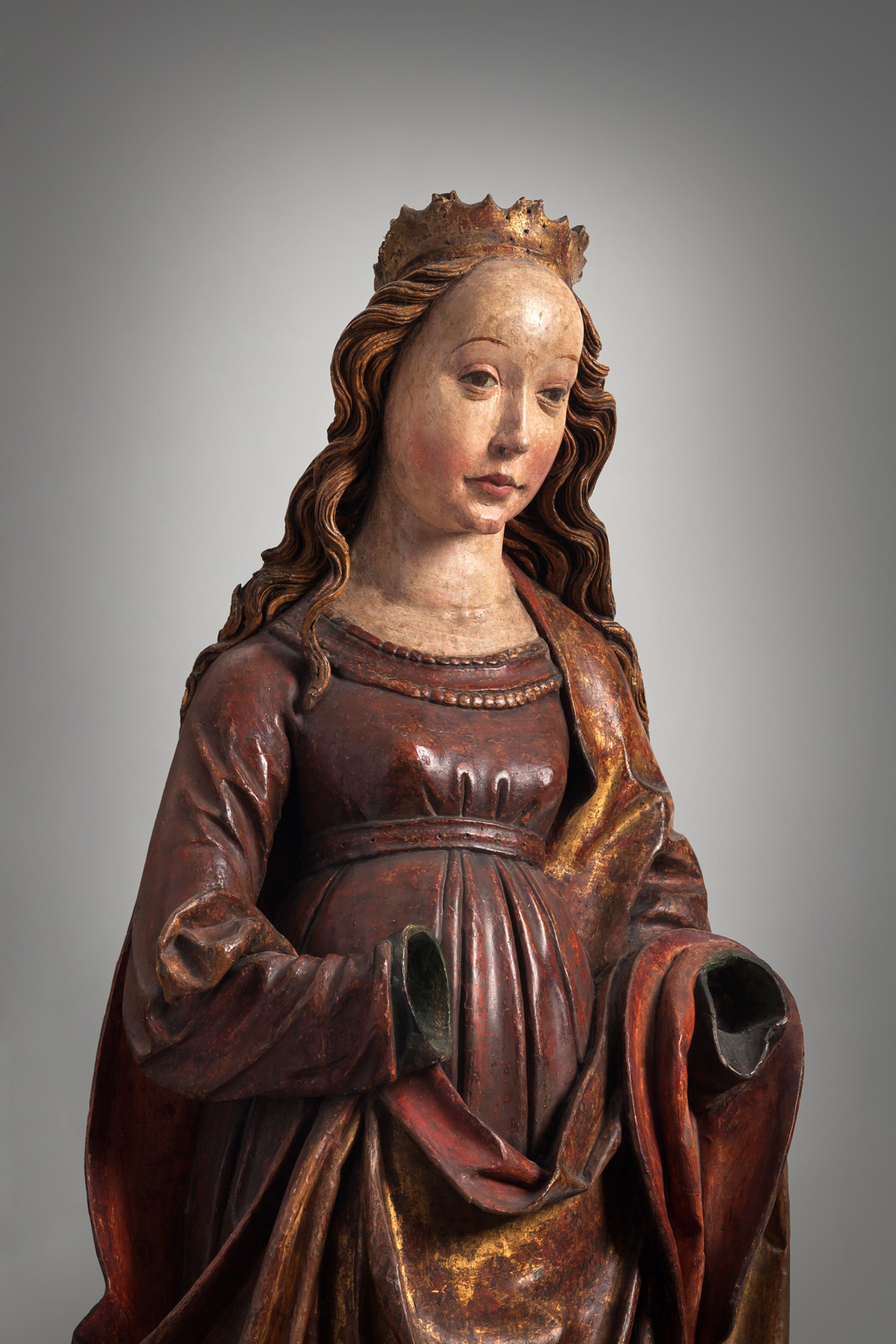

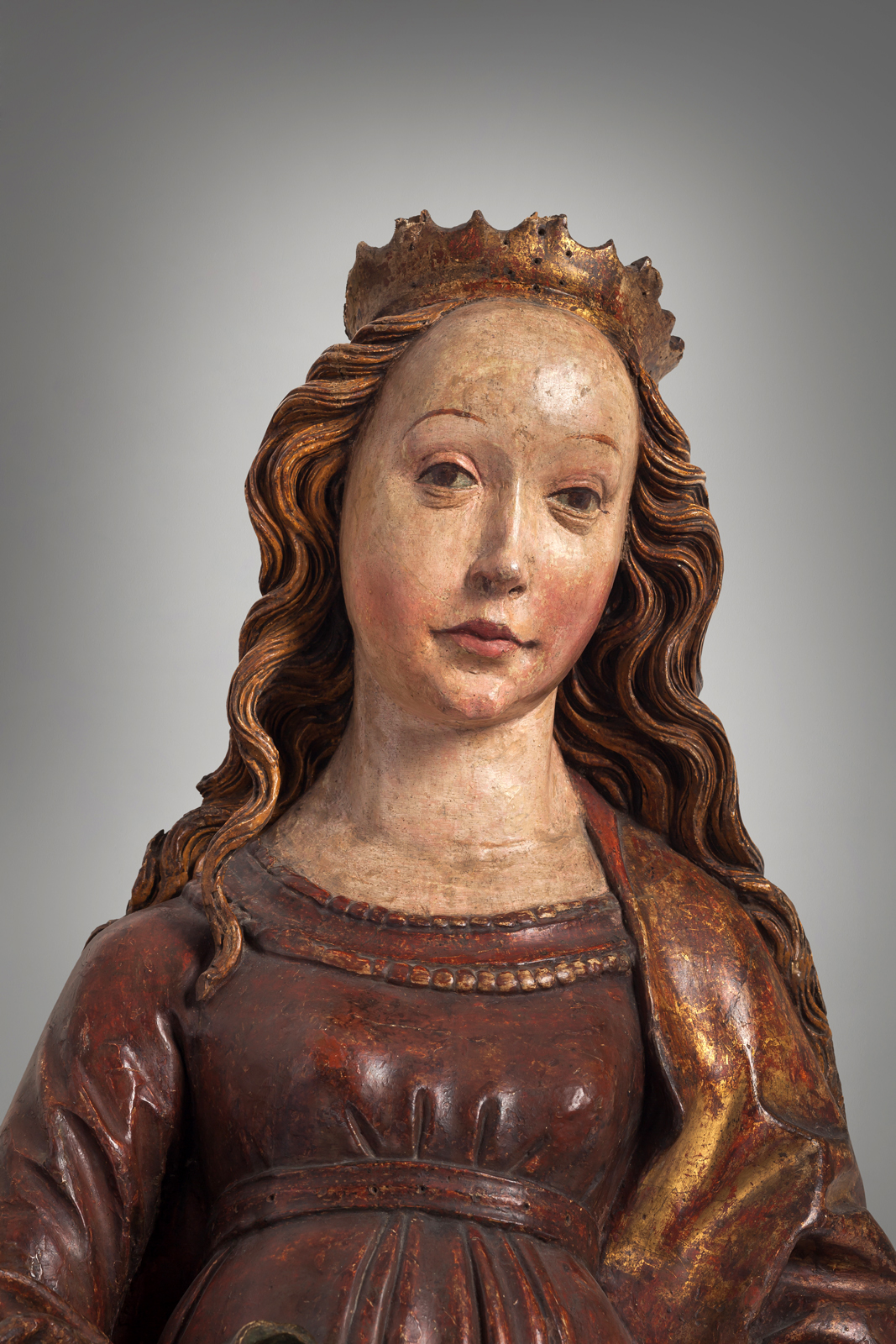

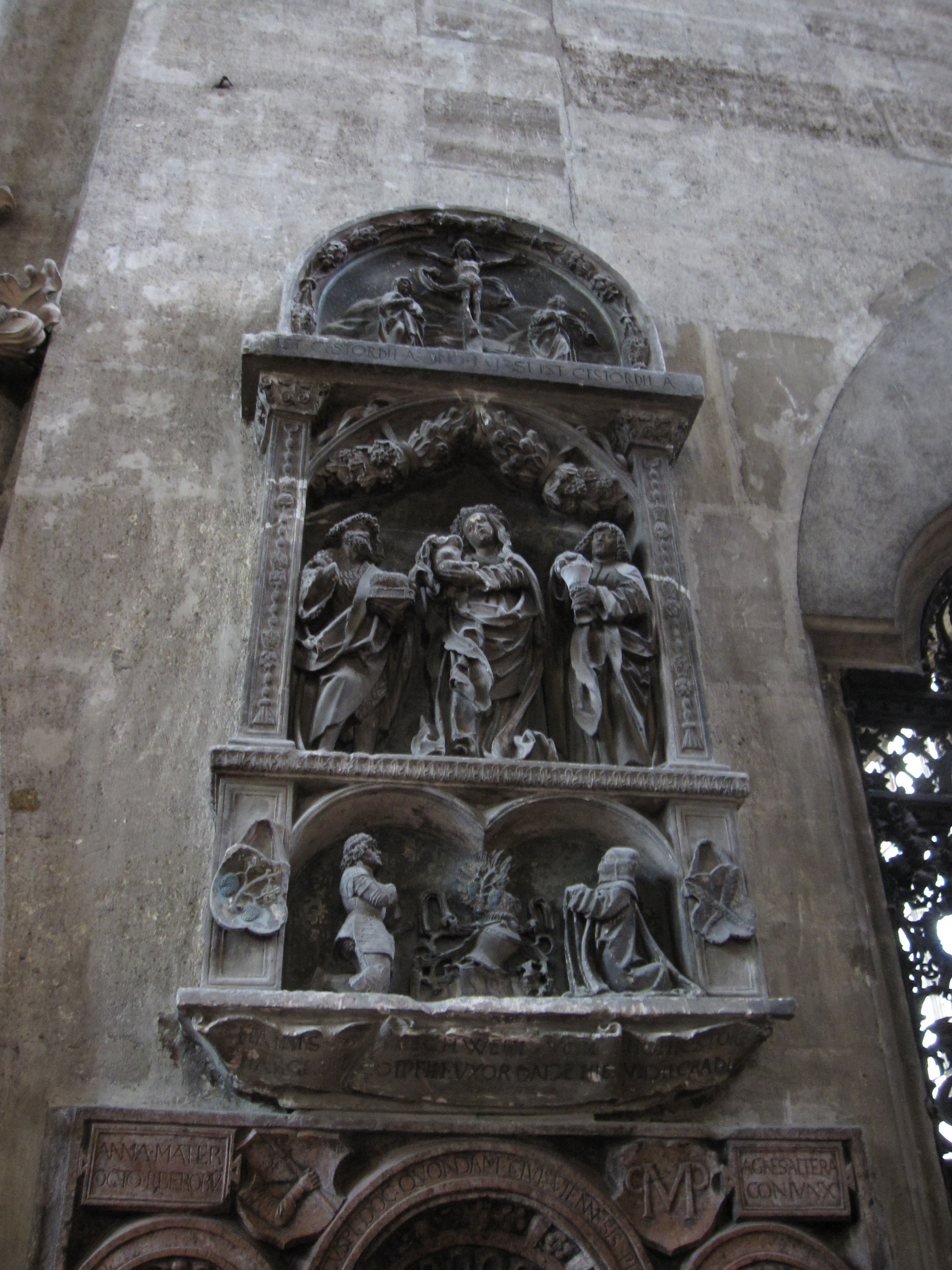
Gravestone of Hans Rechwein von Honigstorf, Stephansdom Wien
- Altar of St. Anne (Vienna)
- Mary of Kralovice, Master of Lamentation from Žebrák

== Sources ==
- Evidence sheet, Inv. no. P-68, Aleš South Bohemian Gallery in Hluboká nad Vltavou
- Hynek Látal, Petra Lexová, Martin Vaněk, Meziprůzkumy, AJG Collection 1300-2016, No. 9, AJG Hluboká nad Vltavou 2016, ISBN 978-80-87799-52-9
- Roman Lavička, Gothic Art, Aleš South Bohemian Gallery 2008, pp. 62-63, ISBN 978-80-86952-57-4
- Hynek Rulíšek, Gothic Art of South Bohemia, Guide, vol. 3, Aleš South Bohemian Gallery in Hluboká nad Vltavou 1989, ISBN 80-900057-6-4
- Hynek Rulíšek, Gothic Art in South Bohemia, National Gallery in Prague 1989, ISBN 80-7035-013-X
- Albert Kutal, On the exhibition South Bohemian Late Gothic 1450-1530, Umění XIX, 1966
- Jaromír Homolka, On the restoration of some sculptures by the Master of Zvíkov, Památková péče vol. 23, 1963
- Jiří Kropáček, in: Catalogue of Sculpture, South Bohemian Late Gothic 1450-1530, pp. 241-243, Aleš South Bohemian Gallery in Hluboká nad Vltavou 1965
