= Master of Lamentation from Zvíkov =

Master of Lamentation from Zvíkov was a late Gothic carver who worked in south-west Bohemia in the first third of the 16th century.

== Life and work ==
The very rich artistic culture of the Úhlava and upper Otava basin reached its peak at the turn of the 15th and 16th centuries in the commissions of Botho Schwihau von Riesenberg and Zdeněk Lev of Rožmitál. The Master of Lamentation from Zvíkov probably came from the workshop of the Master of Lamentation from Žebrák. He has been known only since the 1960s, because some of his sculptures were previously mistakenly attributed to the Master of Lamentation from Žebrák. If he had his own independent workshop, he worked somewhere on the so called Golden Trail (Goldener Steig) – either in Kašperské Hory or Sušice.

The most famous work of this anonymous master is the Lamentation of Christ from the chapel at Zvíkov Castle, which depicts Mary kneeling in silent prayer over the body of Christ. The composition of the relief is similar to that of the Brussels painting by the Dutch painter Petrus Christus. The body of the dead man lies on a shroud laid on the ground, and his head and shoulder rest on Mary's right knee.

In the Viennese Lamentation of Christ the motif of the Pietà and the standing figures of St John, Joseph of Arimathea and The Three Marys is used. The expressively contorted body of Jesus recalls the dead man of the Lamentation by another anonymous carver - Master of Lamentation from Žebrák.

=== Notable works (selection) ===
- relief of the Lamentation of Christ from the Zvíkov Castle Chapel
- Relief of the Lamentation of Christ, Diocesan Museum in Vienna
- large altarpiece, St. Margaret's Church in Kašperské Hory (three main figures from the ark's case - Madonna, St. Margaret and St. Linhart and the crucified Christ from its extension - have been preserved)
- statues of the Madonna, St. Barbara and St. Catherine of Černívsko
- statue of the Madonna from the branch church in Kocelovice - Lnáře (workshop)
- Female Saint of Homole

=== Exhibitions (selection) ===
- 2013 Images of Beauty and Salvation, Medieval Meat Marketplace Building, Plzeň
- 2014 Gothic in Southwest Bohemia: Images of Beauty and Salvation, National Gallery in Prague, Šternberk Palace
- 2014 Gothic Art in the Otava and Úhlava Regions, Museum of Sumava, Kašperské Hory
