= Velhartice =

- Municipality
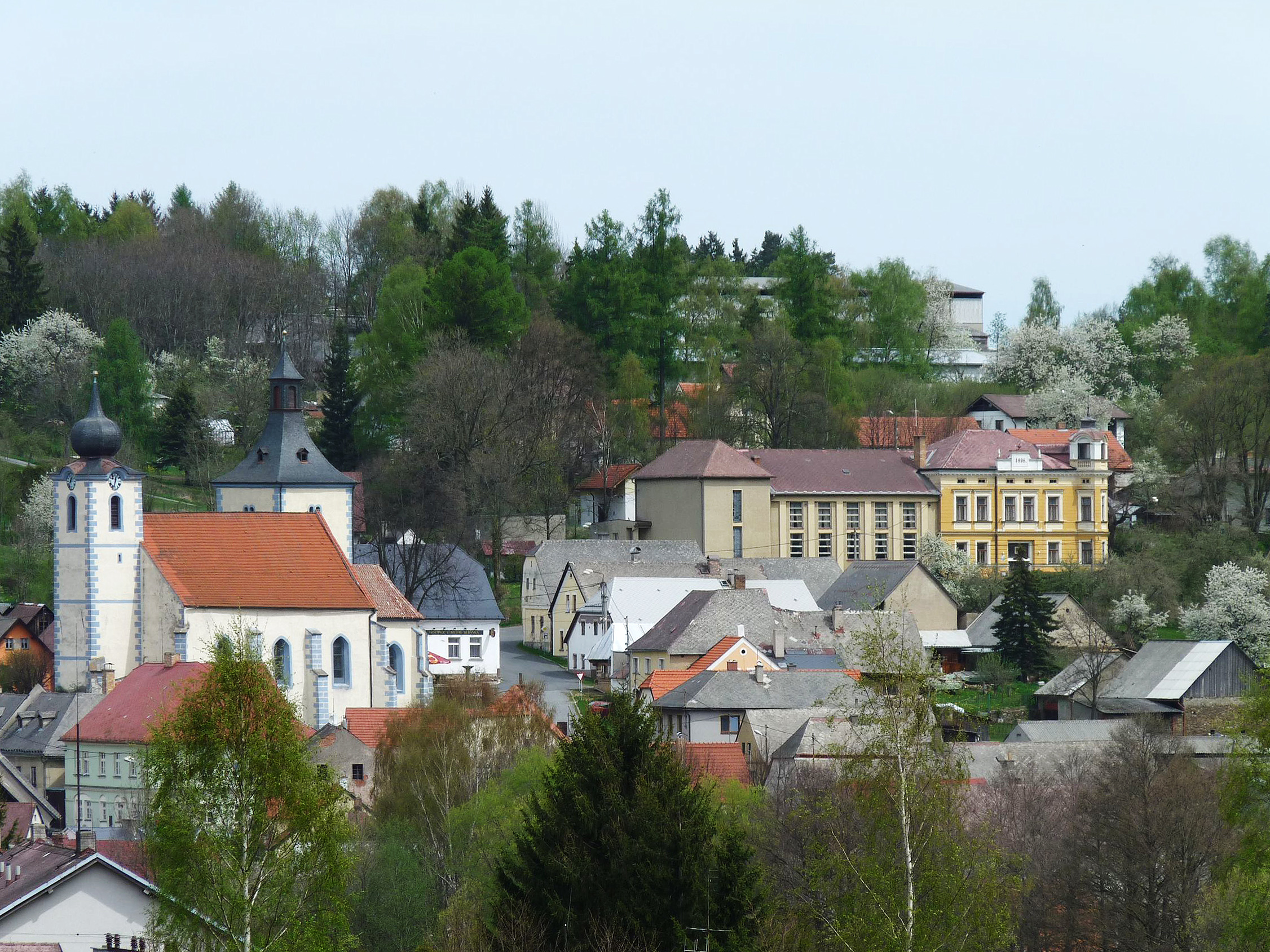
- Church of the Nativity of the Virgin Mary and the municipal office

- Coat of arms

- Location in the Czech Republic
- Coordinates: 49°15′55″N 13°23′23″E
- Country: Czech Republic
- Region: Plzeň
- District: Klatovy
- First mentioned: 1318

Area
  - Total: 27.25 km^{2} (10.52 sq mi)
- Elevation: 622 m (2,041 ft)

Population (2026-01-01)
  - Total: 858
  - Density: 31.5/km^{2} (81.5/sq mi)
- Time zone: UTC+1 (CET)
  - Summer (DST): UTC+2 (CEST)
- Postal code: 339 01
- Website: www.velhartice.cz

Velhartice (German: Welhartitz) is a municipality and village in Klatovy District in the Plzeň Region of the Czech Republic. It has about 900 inhabitants. The historic centre is well preserved and is protected as an urban monument zone.

== Administrative division ==
Velhartice consists of 11 municipal parts (in brackets population according to the 2021 census):

- Velhartice (404)
- Braníčkov (1)
- Chotěšov (105)
- Drouhavec (21)
- Hory Matky Boží (96)
- Jarkovice (0)
- Konín (3)
- Nemilkov (149)
- Radvanice (1)
- Stojanovice (35)
- Tvrdoslav (9)

== Etymology ==
The initial name of the settlement was Vilhartice. The name was derived from the personal name Vilhart, meaning "the village of Vilhart's people".

== Geography ==
Velhartice is located about 16 kilometres (10 mi) south of Klatovy and 51 km (32 mi) south of Plzeň. It lies in the Bohemian Forest Foothills. The highest point is at 966 m (3,169 ft) above sea level. The Ostružná River flows through the municipality.

== History ==
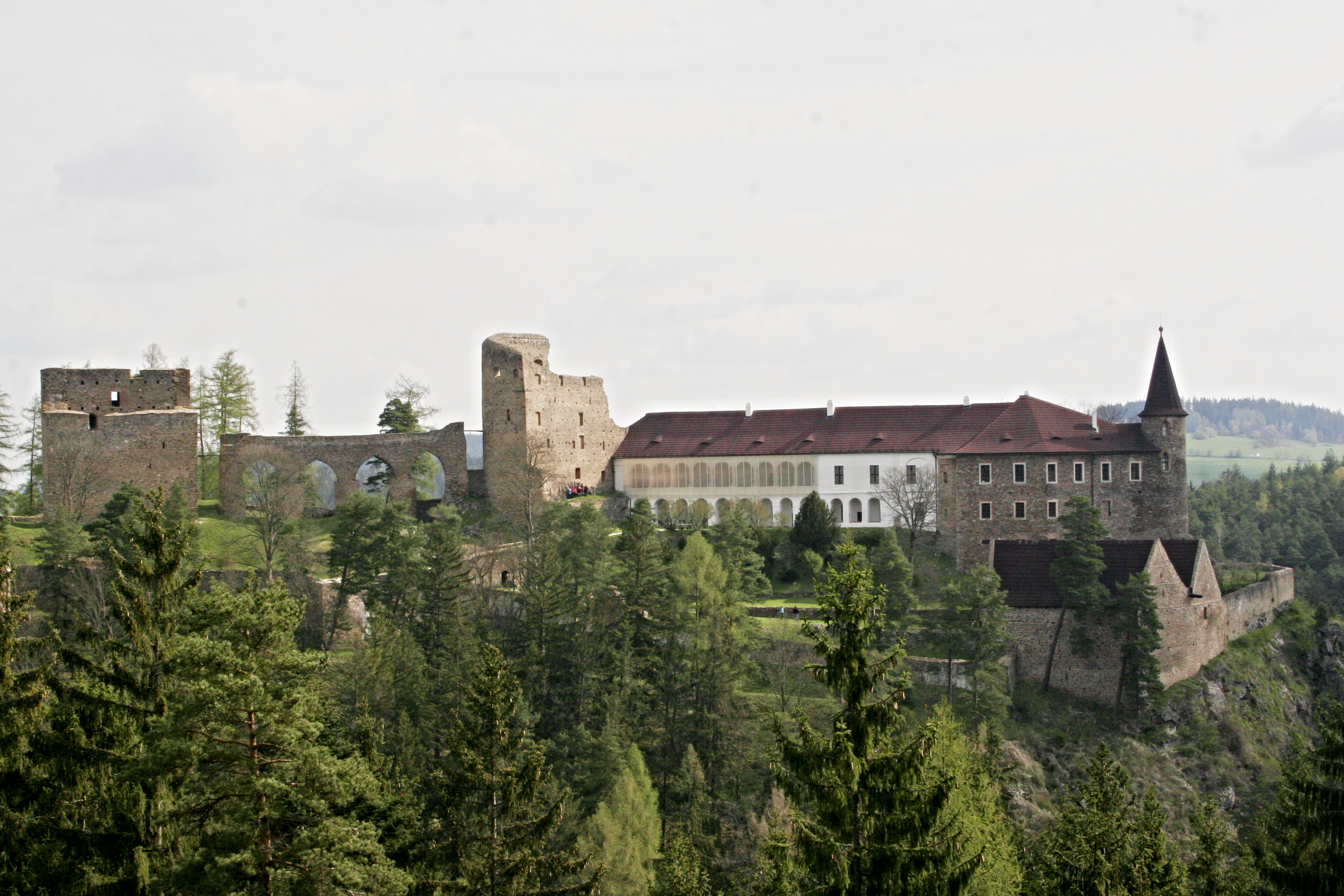
Velhartice Castle

The first written mention of the Velhartice settlement is from 1318. However, the Velhartice Castle was built already in 1290–1310 by Bušek the Elder and Bušek the Younger, who later became known as the Lords of Velhartice and became chamberlains of Emperor Charles IV.

In the 15th century, a significant owner of Velhartice was Zdeněk Lev of Rožmitál, who granted the estate the right to mine precious metals. The prosperity ended with the Thirty Years' War. During the war, Velhartice was acquired by Don Martin de Hoeff-Huerta, who had the castle rebuilt. Hoeff-Huerta tried to forcefully re-Catholicise the region, but he also abolished the corvée.

At the end of the 18th century, the then-owners of Velhartice, the Desfours family, founded a paper mill. The second paper mill was founded in 1865. A leather-tanning factory opened in 1882. The last owner of the Velhartice Castle before it became state-owned, Prince Joseph Windisch-Graetz, was expelled to Austria in 1946.

== Demographics ==
Historical population

Year	Pop.	±%
1869	2,913	—
1880	2,856	−2.0%
1890	2,641	−7.5%
1900	2,584	−2.2%
1910	2,625	+1.6%

Year	Pop.	±%
1921	2,650	+1.0%
1930	2,409	−9.1%
1950	1,653	−31.4%
1961	1,580	−4.4%
1970	1,350	−14.6%

Year	Pop.	±%
1980	1,087	−19.5%
1991	977	−10.1%
2001	939	−3.9%
2011	841	−10.4%
2021	824	−2.0%

Source: Censuses

== Transport ==
The train stop Nemilkov, located on the railway line Klatovy–Horažďovice, is situated in the northern part of the municipal territory, outside the built-up area.

== Sights ==
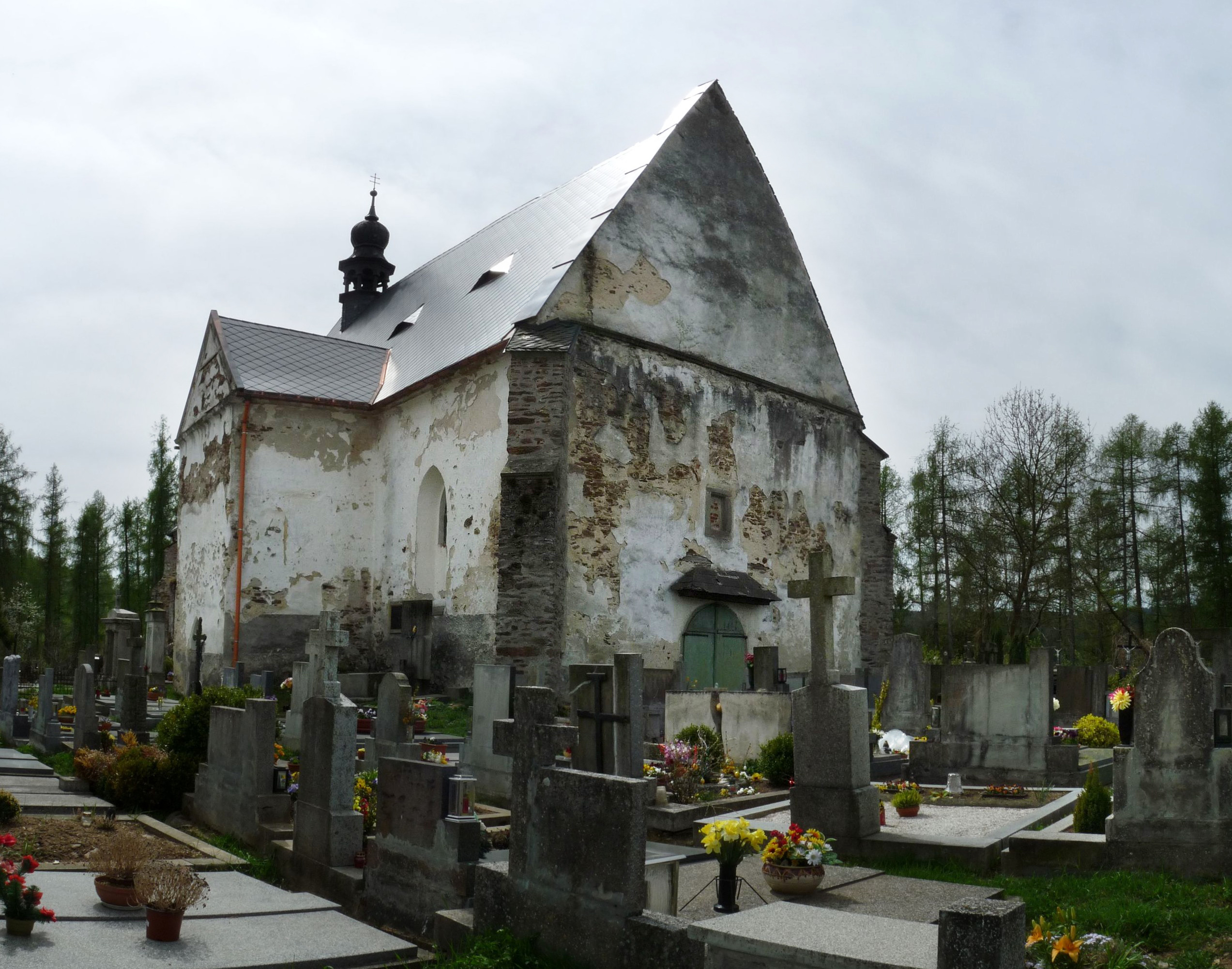
Church of Saint Mary Magdalene

The main landmark of Velhartice is the Velhartice Castle. It was built in the Gothic style in 1290–1310 and rebuilt in the late Renaissance style in the first half of the 17th century. Today it is owned by the state and open to the public.

In Nemilkov is the Nemilkov Castle. It is a Renaissance-Baroque residence built on the remains of a medieval Gothic fortress from the 14th century. The fortress was rebuilt in the 16th century and extended in the late 18th century. During the 20th century, it was damaged by careless use. Today it is in private ownership and is gradually being repaired.

The Church of the Nativity of the Virgin Mary. It was originally a Romanesque church founded around 1240, rebuilt and extended in the Gothic style in 1325. Renaissance modifications were made after 1510, further Baroque modifications date from the 18th and 19th centuries.

The Church of Saint Mary Magdalene is a cemetery church which is said to be one of the scariest places in the country, and is associated with several legends. It was built in 1373 and rebuilt in the 16th century.

== See also ==
- Velhartice Ark
