= Saint Mary Magdalene (Erhart) =

Sculpture by Gregor Erhart

- Sainte Marie Madeleine (French), La Belle Allemande (French)
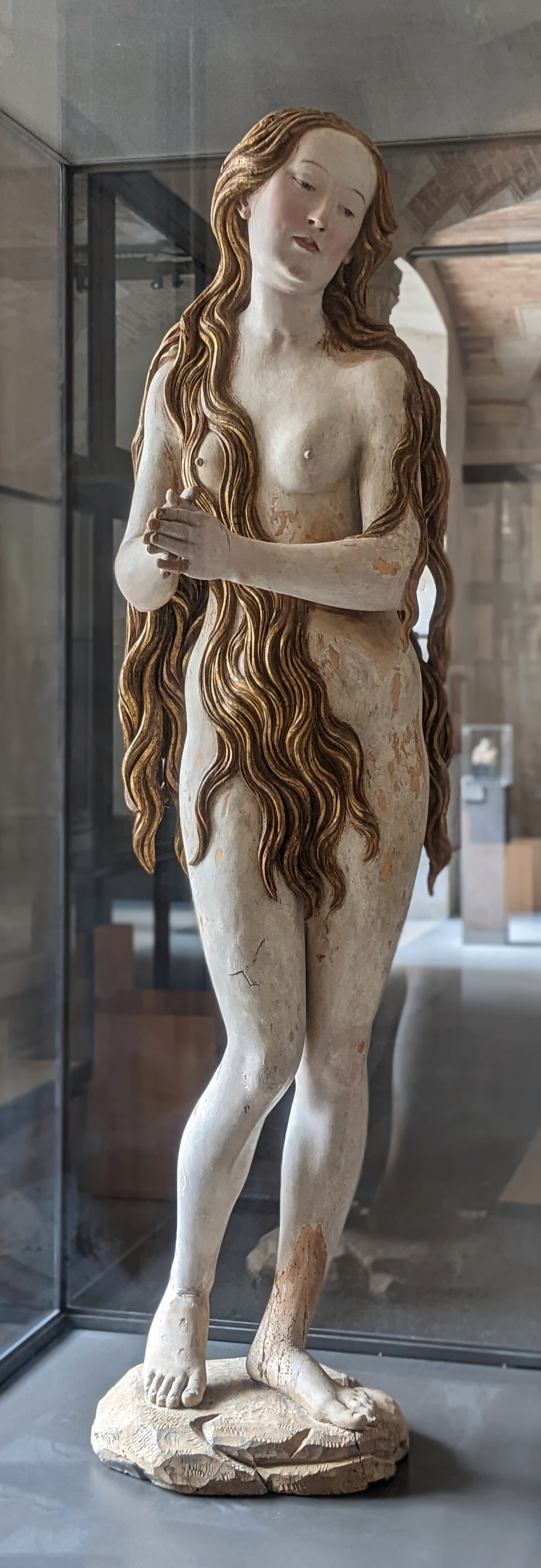
- Artist: Gregor Erhart
- Year: 1515 / 1520
- Catalogue: RF 1338
- Medium: polychrome paint on linden
- Movement: Late Gothic art; Ulm School
- Subject: Mary Magdalene
- Dimensions: 1.77 m × 0.43 m × .44 m (70 in × 17 in × 17 in)
- Location: Louvre, Paris, France
- Website: https://collections.louvre.fr/en/ark:/53355/cl010093565

Saint Mary Magdalene (French - Sainte Marie-Madeleine) Penitent Magdalene (Madeleine pénitente) or The Beautiful German Woman (La Belle Allemande) is a painted wooden sculpture of a nude Mary Magdalene by Gregor Erhart (died 1540) of the Ulm School.

The statue was originally a church decoration in 16th century Augsburg, Bavaria. Following the deconsecration of the church, the statue passed through private collections in the 19th century until being obtained by the Louvre.

During World War II it was an object notoriously coveted by Nazi war criminal Hermann Gőring, who acquired in 1943 for his art collection, in a trade with the Louvre that involved plundered artworks. The statue was later recovered from his residence by the Allies in 1945 and returned to the Louvre, where it has remained since.

== Description and subject ==
Erhart's statue depicts a nude Mary Magdalene with her eyes downcast and hands together in prayer. She is clad only in her long hair, covering her buttocks and groin while still framing her breasts and legs. The pose emphasizes the tension of Mary Magdalene's sensuality and modesty, akin to classical sculptures of the Venus pudica type.

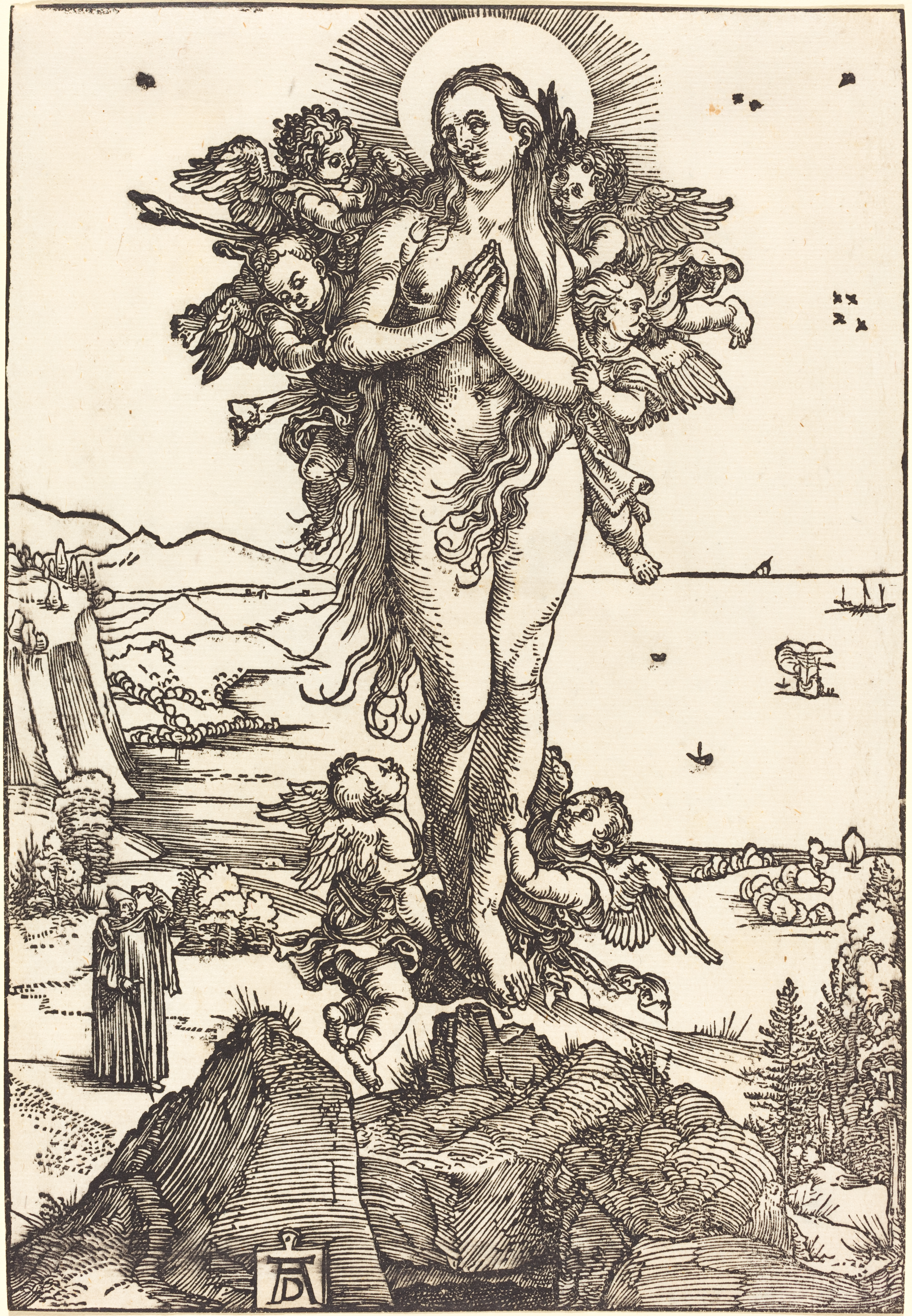
Albrecht Dürer, The Elevation of Saint Mary Magdalene, c. 1504-1505, a possible inspiration for the Erhart Magdalene.

The depiction of Mary Magdalene accords with her hagiography from Jacobus de Voragine's Golden Legend, a source of apocryphal lore about saints popular in Western Christendom. As recounted in the Golden Legend, Mary Magdalene lived her later years in Provence as a hermit receiving religious ecstasies while in prayer:

"[E]very day at the seven hours canonical she was lifted in the air of the angels […] when the priest came to her, he found her enclosed in her cell; and she required of him a vestment."

Examinations of the narrative of the Golden Legend note that it conflates Mary Magdalene's life with the account of Mary of Egypt. The two Marys were both depicted as former prostitutes who took up asceticism as penitence, clothed only in their own hair until they receive a gift of clothing from a chaste male saint (Mary Magdalene from Maximinus of Aix; Mary of Egypt from Zosimas of Palestine).

Grove Art Online suggests that Erhart may have been inspired by Albrecht Dürer's woodcut Elevation of Saint Mary Magdalene, but describes the work as "an astonishing advance towards a new autonomy in the field of sculpture." Employing the polychrome wood carving posed in the contrapposto manner, Erhart blends characteristics of both Gothic sculpture and Renaissance art.

== Display and ownership from 16th to early 20th centuries ==
The sculpture originally adorned the Dominican Church of St. Magdalene in Augsburg, suspended from the vault supported by flying angels. The Church of St. Magdalene was attached to a monastery of the Dominican Order. This monastery was secularized in the early 19th century, and the church deconsecrated and its decorations were removed.

The Erhart Magdalene shows several signs of alteration over its lifetime. These include the filling of the voids left by attachment points for suspension and the angels, as well as small cavities from clothing tacked on in the 17th or 18th century. The base and feet seen on the Erhart Magdalene were 19th century additions.

After its removal from the church, provenance documents show that it passed through the hands of art dealer Siegfried Lämmle of Munich and then antiquarian Godefroy Brauer of Paris and Nice. The Louvre then acquired it in 1902 using funds from a bequest by Émile Louis Sévène (née Laure Eugénie Declerck).

== Acquisition by Hermann Göring and return ==
According to historians of Nazi plunder and Vichy-era France, following the Nazi invasion and occupation of France Hermann Göring became obsessed with the Erhart Magdalene as an artwork he viewed as German cultural patrimony and embodying "Aryan" beauty standards and the aesthetics of the Nazi feminine ideal. Göring demanded French curators organize a special viewing for him in November 1940, and he engaged in negotiations with Louvre to obtain the sculpture. Jacques Jaujard ultimately relented, letting Göring take the sculpture in 1943 in exchange for the Louvre receiving artworks from Göring's collection.

=== Recovery by the Monuments Men ===
In 1945, the Allies Monuments Men recovered the statue among other hoarded artworks at Göring's residence at Berchtesgaden (although it was misidentified as Eve in one photograph caption). Thomas Carr Howe, Jr. described the recovery of the statue with a note of ribald humor in his memoirs:

The outstanding piece of sculpture was a life-size statue of the Magdalene which Göring had acquired from the Louvre. […] The statue, portraying the Magdalene clothed only in her long blonde tresses, was known as “la belle allemande,” the beautiful German. It was an exceptionally fine example, in polychromed wood, of the work of Gregor Erhardt, a Swabian sculptor of the first quarter of the sixteenth century. I fancied that Göring detected a resemblance between the statue and his wife. Lamont and I carried the statue down to the first floor of the rest house and placed it at the foot of the stairs.

It was one of the last objects we packed for shipment and, during our stay at Berchtesgaden, I had the uncomfortable feeling that I had caught Frau Göring on her way to the bath. I was not the only one with that idea. One evening I found the GI guard draping a raincoat about the Magdalene’s shoulders. I had given strict orders that the guards were to touch nothing in the collection, so I stopped to have a word with him on the subject. He said with a sheepish look, “I didn’t mean to break the rules, sir, but I thought Emmy looked cold.”

— Salt Mines and Castles

The sculpture was repatriated to the Louvre thereafter.

=== Nuremburg trial testimony ===
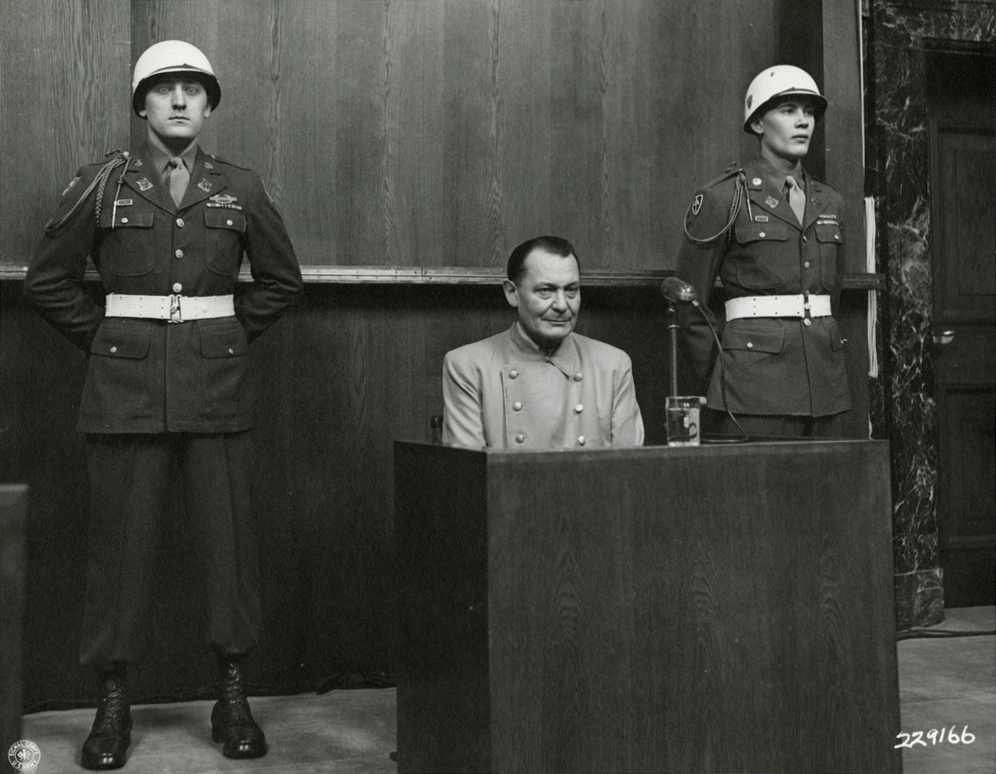
Hermann Göring on trial at Nuremberg 1946

In Janet Flanner's 1947 recap of Göring's Nuremberg trial for The New Yorker, she noted that the Tribunal allowed Göring to protest that he had never stolen the Erhart Magdalene (described as "'La Belle Allemande,' a life-size, echt Deutsch, painted wooden statue of a blond-haired, fat-buttocked, naked, sixteenth-century Hausfrau"). Avalon Project transcripts from Friday, 15 March 1946 recorded his contention:

I did not confiscate a single object, or in any way remove anything from the state museums, with the exception of two contracts for an exchange with the Louvre on an entirely voluntary basis. I traded a statue which is known in the history of art as La Belle Allemande, a carved wood statue which originally came from Germany, for another German wood statue which I had had in my possession for many years before the war, and two pictures -- an exchange such as I used to make before the war with other museums here, and as is customary among museums.

— Nuremberg Trial Proceedings Vol. 9

Flanner noted Göring's omission that collateral to this trade was one in which he paid the Louvre with "a fine Coypel canvas" that was in fact stolen from a member of the Parisian Rothschild family.
