= Michel Erhart =

German sculptor

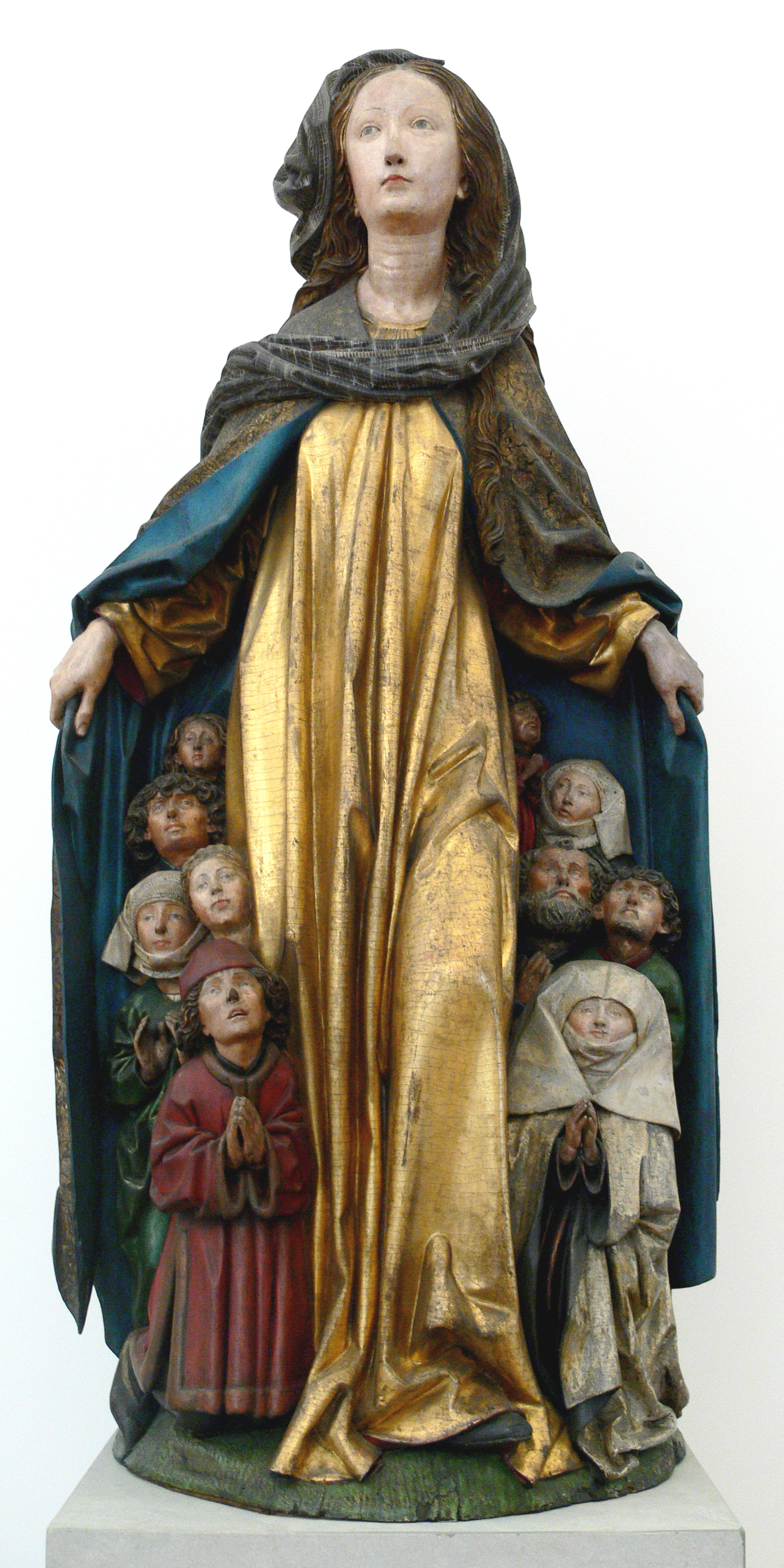
Virgin of Mercy (c. 1480–90), limewood, Bode-Museum, Berlin

Michel Erhart (c. 1440 to 1445 – after 1522, Ulm) was a German late Gothic sculptor who lived and worked in Ulm.

== Life ==
Erhart visited various regions including Konstanz and the Netherlands as a wandering journeyman before finally settling in Ulm around 1469, where works by him are extant from around 1469–1522. He worked in the workshop of Jörg Syrlin the Elder, as did his sons Gregor Erhart and Bernhard Erhart. After 1474 he apparently had his own workshop with numerous apprentices.

Erhart's style was apparently influenced by Nikolaus Gerhaert.
