= Ohrazenice (Příbram District) =

- Municipality
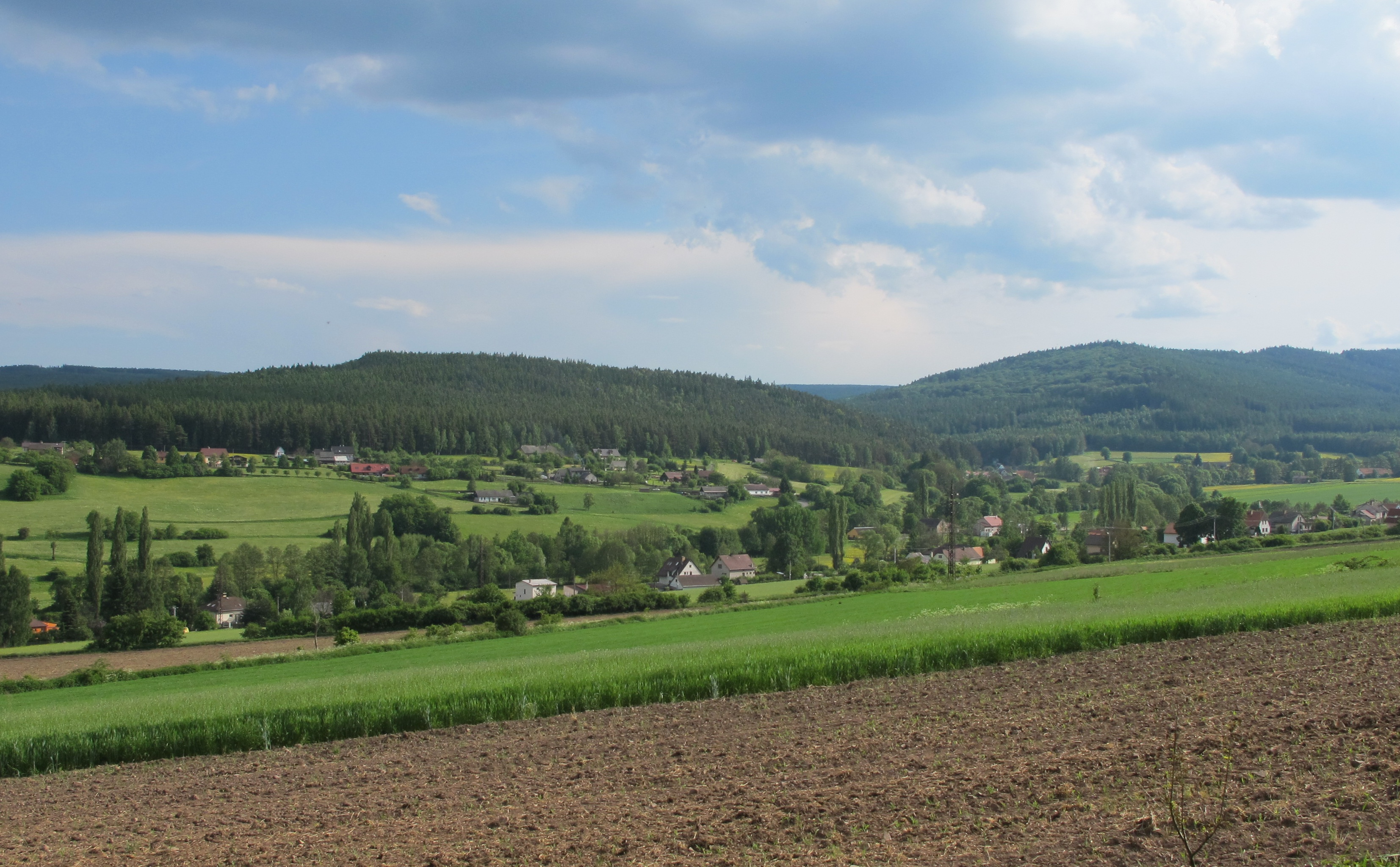
- General view

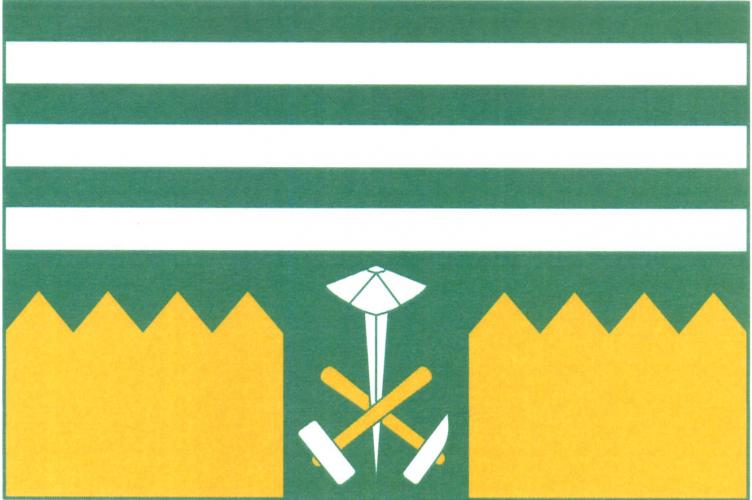
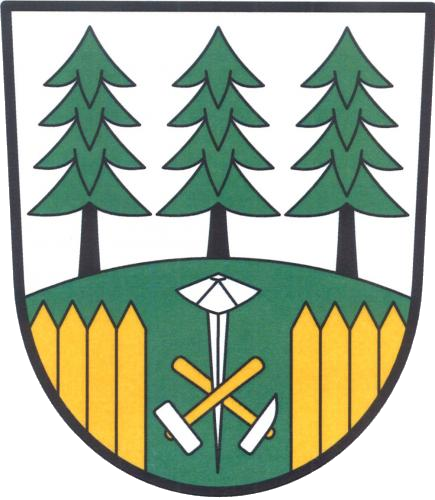
- Flag Coat of arms

- Location in the Czech Republic
- Coordinates: 49°47′14″N 13°57′35″E
- Country: Czech Republic
- Region: Central Bohemian
- District: Příbram
- First mentioned: 1370

Area
  - Total: 5.56 km^{2} (2.15 sq mi)
- Elevation: 415 m (1,362 ft)

Population (2026-01-01)
  - Total: 308
  - Density: 55.4/km^{2} (143/sq mi)
- Time zone: UTC+1 (CET)
  - Summer (DST): UTC+2 (CEST)
- Postal code: 262 63
- Website: www.ohrazenice.eu

Ohrazenice is a municipality and village in Příbram District in the Central Bohemian Region of the Czech Republic. It has about 300 inhabitants.

== Demographics ==
Historical population
Year	Pop.	±%
1869	628	—
1880	578	−8.0%
1890	558	−3.5%
1900	570	+2.2%
1910	597	+4.7%
1921	497	−16.8%
1930	425	−14.5%
1950	283	−33.4%
1961	277	−2.1%
1970	257	−7.2%
1980	207	−19.5%
1991	214	+3.4%
2001	234	+9.3%
2011	290	+23.9%
2021	311	+7.2%
Source: Censuses
