= Volenice (Strakonice District) =

- Municipality
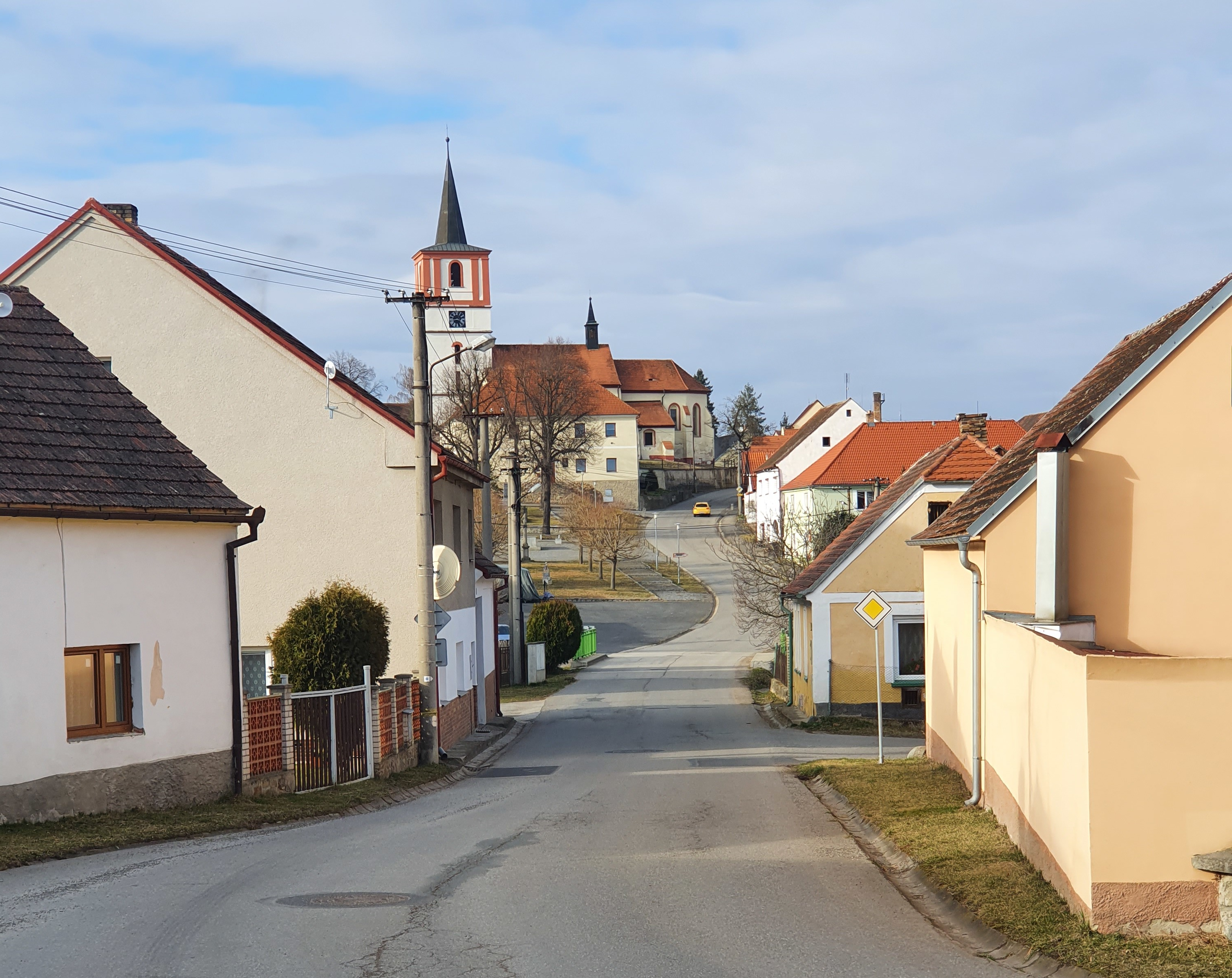
- The street to the Church of Saints Peter and Paul

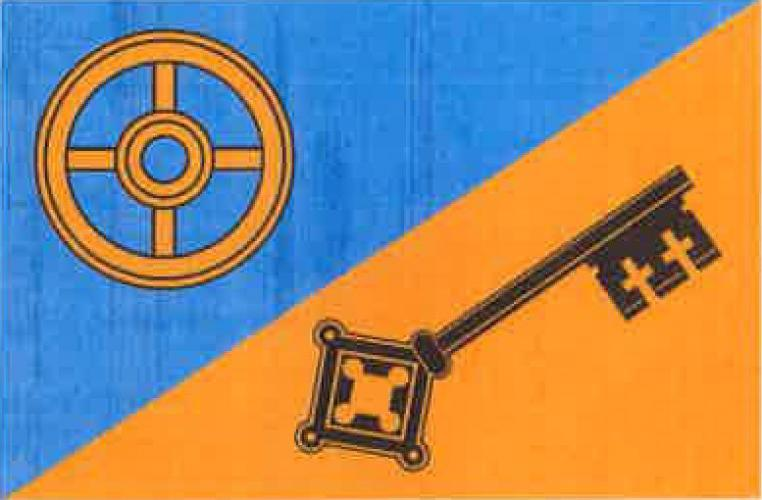
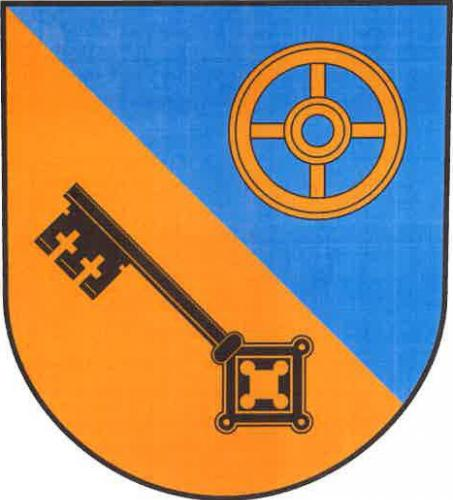
- Flag Coat of arms

- Location in the Czech Republic
- Coordinates: 49°15′9″N 13°44′52″E
- Country: Czech Republic
- Region: South Bohemian
- District: Strakonice
- First mentioned: 1227

Area
  - Total: 15.95 km^{2} (6.16 sq mi)
- Elevation: 459 m (1,506 ft)

Population (2026-01-01)
  - Total: 580
  - Density: 36/km^{2} (94/sq mi)
- Time zone: UTC+1 (CET)
  - Summer (DST): UTC+2 (CEST)
- Postal code: 387 16
- Website: www.obecvolenice.eud.cz

Volenice is a municipality and village in Strakonice District in the South Bohemian Region of the Czech Republic. It has about 600 inhabitants.

Volenice lies approximately 12 kilometres (7 mi) west of Strakonice, 62 km (39 mi) north-west of České Budějovice, and 106 km (66 mi) south-west of Prague.

== Administrative division ==
Volenice consists of five municipal parts (in brackets population according to the 2021 census):

- Volenice (410)
- Ohrazenice (16)
- Tažovice (84)
- Tažovická Lhota (13)
- Vojnice (15)

Vojnice forms an exclave of the municipal territory.

== Demographics ==
Historical population
Year	Pop.	±%
1869	1,466	—
1880	1,430	−2.5%
1890	1,430	+0.0%
1900	1,312	−8.3%
1910	1,302	−0.8%
1921	1,290	−0.9%
1930	1,265	−1.9%
1950	914	−27.7%
1961	850	−7.0%
1970	727	−14.5%
1980	676	−7.0%
1991	606	−10.4%
2001	553	−8.7%
2011	515	−6.9%
2021	538	+4.5%
Source: Censuses
