= Gregor Erhart =

German sculptor

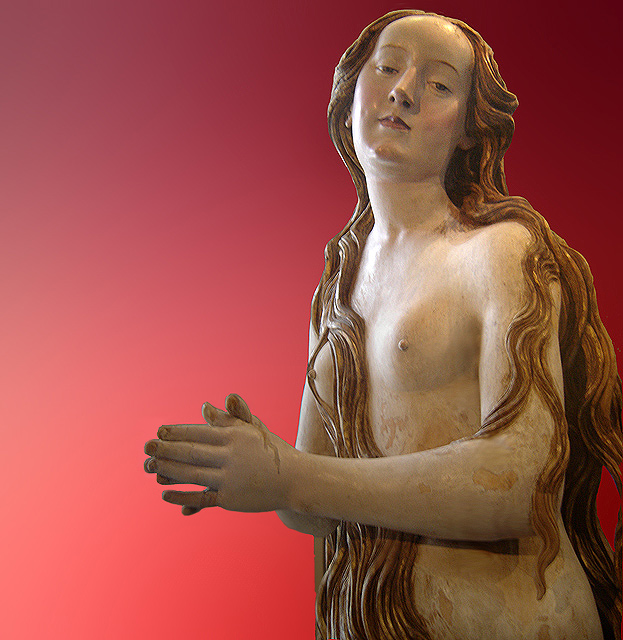
Mary Magdalene, attributed to Gregor Erhart (Louvre)

Gregor Erhart (c. 1470? – 1540) was a German sculptor who was born at Ulm, the son of sculptor Michel Erhart. Gregor spent his working career at Augsburg, where he was made master in 1496, and where he died.

Attributions of sculpture to his workshop, mixing Late Gothic and Renaissance formulas, are based on a single documented work originally from the Cistercian Kaisheim Abbey, which was lost in World War II.
