= Eggendorf im Traunkreis =

- Municipality
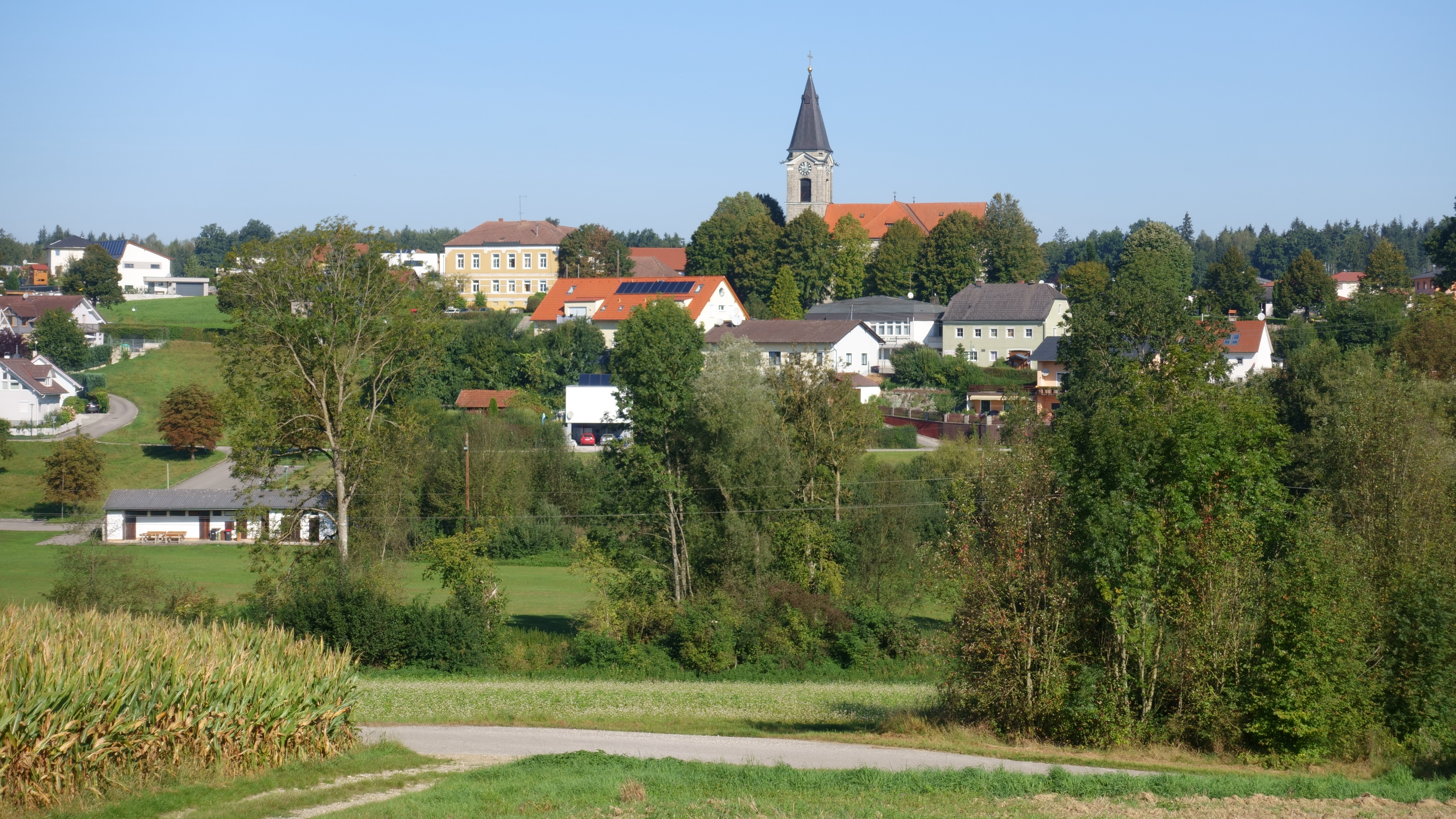

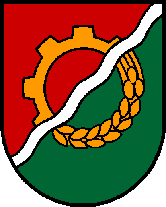
- Coat of arms

- Location within Austria
- Coordinates: 48°7′54″N 14°8′46″E
- Country: Austria
- State: Upper Austria
- District: Linz-Land

Government
  - Mayor: Johann Steinkogler (SPÖ)

Area
  - Total: 9.29 km^{2} (3.59 sq mi)
- Elevation: 364 m (1,194 ft)

Population (2018-01-01)
  - Total: 944
  - Density: 102/km^{2} (263/sq mi)
- Time zone: UTC+1 (CET)
  - Summer (DST): UTC+2 (CEST)
- Postal code: 4622
- Area code: 07228
- Vehicle registration: LL

Eggendorf im Traunkreis is a municipality in the district Linz-Land in the Austrian state of Upper Austria.

== Population ==
Historical population
Year	Pop.	±%
1869	574	—
1880	556	−3.1%
1890	573	+3.1%
1900	544	−5.1%
1910	549	+0.9%
1923	580	+5.6%
1934	595	+2.6%
1939	606	+1.8%
1951	603	−0.5%
1961	532	−11.8%
1971	457	−14.1%
1981	516	+12.9%
1991	556	+7.8%
2001	698	+25.5%
2011	776	+11.2%
2014	837	+7.9%
