= Lamentation of Christ (Master of the Žebrák Lamentation of Christ) =

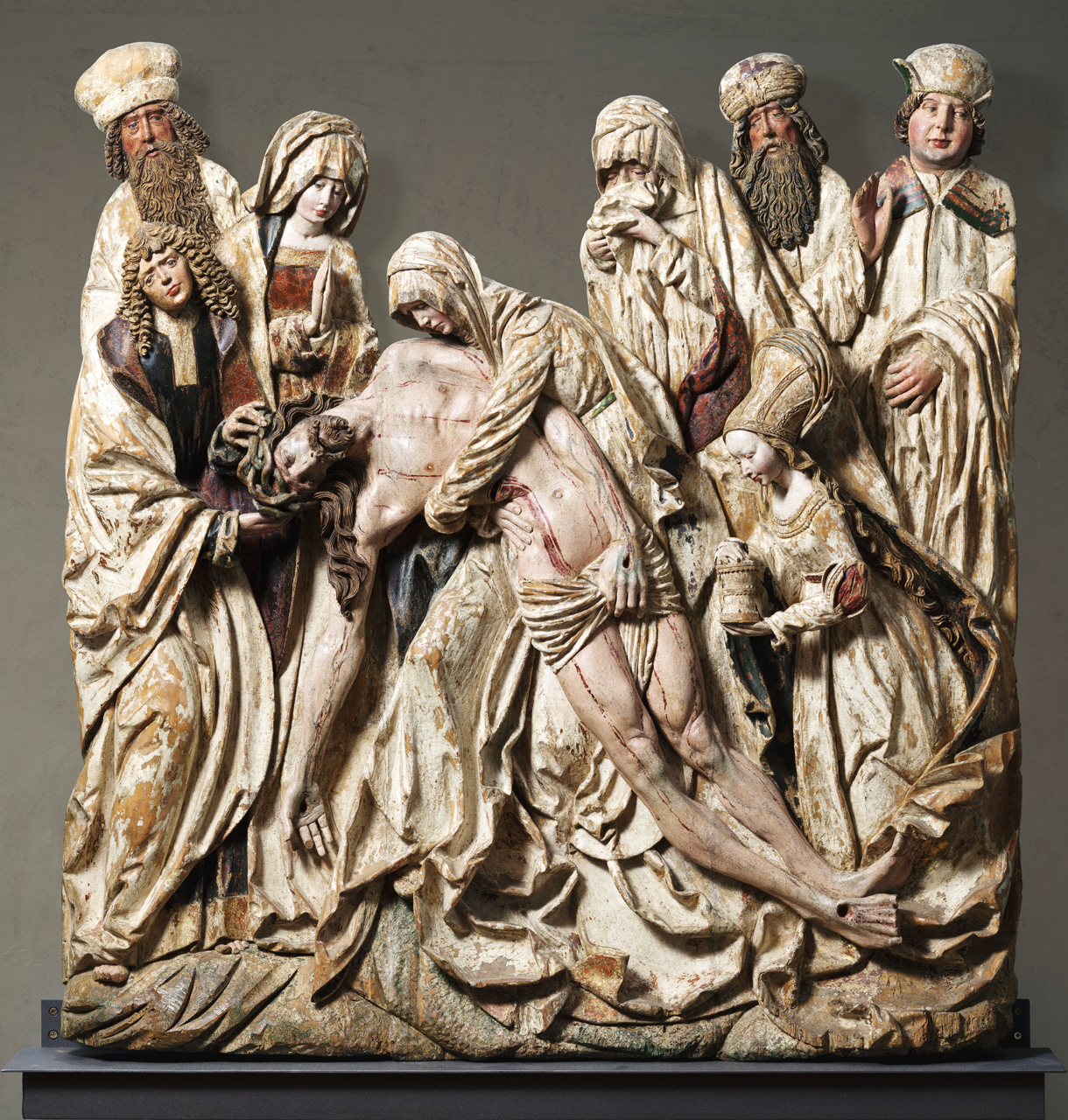
Lamentation of Christ from Žebrák, National Gallery in Prague

Lamentation of Christ from Žebrák is a lime wood relief of the common subject of the Lamentation of Christ, from about 1510. It ranks among the finest works of Late Gothic sculpture in Bohemia. The anonymous artist, who is called the "Master of the Žebrák Lamentation of Christ" after this work, probably had his workshop in České Budějovice and could have been the same person as the woodcarver Alexandr (Alexandr Schniczer) who was in charge of that town's guild between 1503 and 1516. The relief is now part of the permanent collection of medieval art at the National Gallery in Prague.

== History of the work ==
The original location of the relief, which was created around 1510 and probably formed the central part of an altarpiece with side wings, is not known (possibly the castle chapel of Žebrák?). As recently as 1904 the relief was bought from a private owner in the village of Žebrák for the Prague City Museum. It was the art historian V.V. Štech who, in 1913, first mentioned the sculpture in literature. It was in the collection of the National Museum until 1922, and from 1957 it has been part of the collection of the National Gallery in Prague. It was there that Jiří Tesář restored it in 1965.

== Description and context ==
The relief was carved out of lime wood; it measures 126 x 121 x 15 cm and features traces of original polychromy.

Portraying nine figures, the scene is arranged in two spatial planes. In the foreground, Mary holds the body of the dead Christ in her arms. She is accompanied on her left by St. John, who is taking the crown of thorns from Christ's head, and Mary Magdalene who brings a vessel containing balsam. In the background there probably stands one of the Jews mentioned in the Gospel of Nicodemus together with one of the Marys (Mary of Clopas?); on the right there is a weeping woman, probably Salome, with Nicodemus and Joseph of Arimathaea who is holding the cloth for wrapping the body.

The gestures of Mary, who is holding Christ's limp body in her arms, and St John, who turns away in pain, are restrained and free of pathos. The weeping woman standing on the right behind the Virgin Mary, modelled on a figure in the Descent from the Cross by Rogier van der Weyden, is executed in careful and detailed carving. The pleating of most of the figures’ garments is subordinated to the overall composition and their decorative effect is suppressed. The dramatic aspect is created by the chaotic crumpling of the drapery under Christ’s body and the naturalistic depiction of his body with its wounds and sources of blood that refer to his human nature. The expressive effect is reinforced by the striking way Christ's head hangs down; John's crossed arms draw attention to his thorn crown. Christ's body is long and bony, and resembles another work by the Master of the Žebrák Lamentation – the Group Sculpture of the Holy Trinity at the South Bohemian Museum in České Budějovice. The types of faces in both works also correspond with each other – God the Father and Joseph of Arimathaea. The face of Mary Magdalene also matches the free-standing sculpture of the same saint at the Museum in České Budějovice.

The central Pietà is modelled on the work by a Brussels master from the circle of Rogier van der Weyden (1448). The diagonal of Christ's body with its hanging arms and the head of Mary Magdalene form a triangular composition. The diagonals of the main characters (Mary Magdalene, Christ and John) with their slender limbs form an X-shape in the centre of the relief along with another triangle whose top is formed by Joseph of Arimathaea's head.

The motif of the scene is derived from paintings by the Netherlandish artist Rogier van der Weyden (Descent from the Cross, 1435, Miraflores Altarpiece, 1445) and Dürer's woodcut depicting the Lamentation of Christ (1496). Earlier literature mentioned a relationship between the Master of the Žebrák Lamentation and the Kefermarkt Altarpiece; however more recent works have highlighted the Swabian influence (the Velhartice retable, Gregor Erhart) as well as that of Danube-region sculptures and the Viennese work of Nicolaus Gerhaert and Erasmus Grasser.

The Master of the Žebrák Lamentation followed on from the tradition of late 15th-century woodcarving represented by the Velhartice retable. In his work, the excited pathos and intensity of emotional experience dominates over the physical essence of the figures that are characterised by small heads and elongated bodies. The lyrical element, whose Mannerist proportional arbitrariness recalls echoes of the International Gothic style, mingles here with detailed realistic carving of the faces and the expressive modelling of drapery characteristic of the Late Gothic crumpled folds period.

=== Other known works by Master of the Žebrák Lamentation ===
- 1510 Mourning Mary of Kralovice
- 1510–1520 Holy Trinity, České Budějovice
- 1510–1520 Suffering of Christ, České Budějovice
- 1510–1520 Stigmatisation of St. Francis, České Budějovice
- 1510–1520 Mary Magdalene of Malý Bor
- 1510–1520 Madonna of Malšín, National Gallery in Prague
- 1510–1520 Adoration of the Magi of Vodňany
- 1520 Crucified Christ, Dominican convent in České Budějovice
