= Gothic book illustration =

Style of illustration from the European High and Late Middle Ages

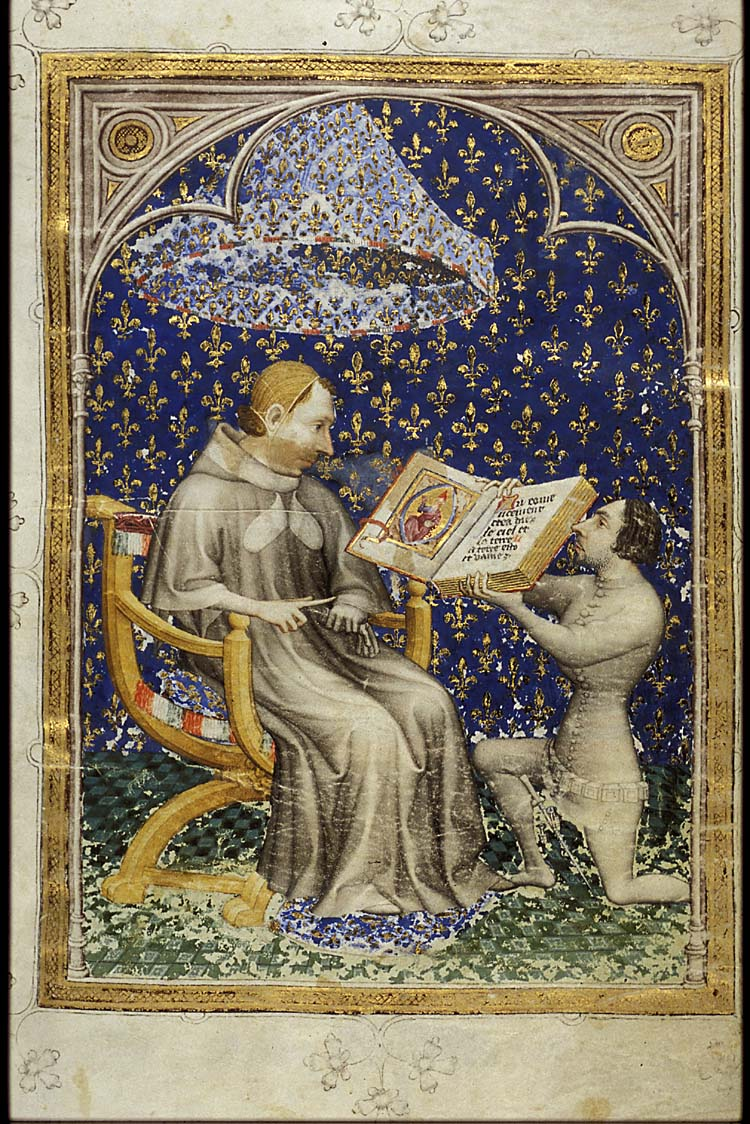
Jean de Bondol: Jean de Vaudetar presents his work, the Bible Historiale, as a gift from King Charles V (France, 1371/72).

Gothic book illustration, or gothic illumination, originated in France and England around 1160/70, while Romanesque forms remained dominant in Germany until around 1300. Throughout the Gothic period, France remained the leading artistic nation, influencing the stylistic developments in book illustration. During the transition from the late Gothic period to the Renaissance, book illustration lost its status as one of the most important artistic genres in the second half of the 15th century, due to the widespread adoption of printing.

During the transition from the 12th to the 13th century, commercial book production emerged alongside monastic book production. Simultaneously, more artistic personalities gained recognition by name. Starting in the 14th century, the master became a common figure, overseeing a workshop that was active in both panel and book painting. During the 13th century, the high nobility replaced the clergy as the primary patrons of book illustration, leading to an increase in secular literature at courts. Despite this shift, the book of hours for private use remained the most commonly illustrated type of book.

Compared to Romanesque painting, Gothic painting is distinguished by a soft, sweeping figure style and flowing draperies. This tendency remained consistent throughout the entire Gothic period and culminated in the so-called "Soft Style". Other distinctive features included the use of contemporary architectural elements to decorate the pictorial fields. From the latter half of the 12th century, red and blue fleuron initials became a common form of decoration in manuscripts of the lower and middle decoration levels throughout Europe. Independent scenes were often executed as historiated initials and drolleries at the lower edge of the picture. These scenes offered space for imaginative depictions that were independent of the illustrated text and contributed significantly to the individualization of painting and the rejection of rigid pictorial formulas. In the 15th century, naturalistic realism became increasingly prevalent in art, particularly through the influence of the southern Netherlands. This style emphasized perspective, spatial depth, light effects, and realistic anatomy of depicted figures, pointing towards the Renaissance.

== Fundamentals of Gothic book illustration ==
=== Temporal and geographical context ===
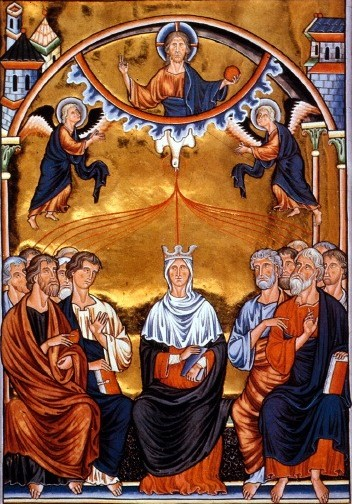
The early Gothic Ingeborg Psalter (Tournai, around 1195).

The Gothic period is a stylistic era in Europe, which excludes the Byzantine cultural sphere, whose art, however, greatly influenced Western European art. The style originated in France, which remained the leading European art nation until the late Gothic period.

The temporal boundaries of the preceding Romanesque period and the subsequent Renaissance are imprecise and can vary by several decades in different regions. In France, Gothic book illustration began around 1200, almost four decades after the first early Gothic cathedrals were built. In England, this change in style began around 1220, while in Germany, Romanesque forms persisted partially until about 1300. The change of style in painting was always preceded by that in architecture. Around 1450, woodcut, particularly in the form of block books, began to compete with laborious book illustrations. The rapid spread of printing and the initially hand-colored prints in the second half of the 15th century largely displaced book illustration. Engraving was developed as a printing technique that also made artistically sophisticated illustrations possible. By the end of the 15th century, engraving had surpassed book illustration in rational and artistic terms. Renaissance artists such as the Master E. S., Martin Schongauer, Albrecht Dürer, and Hans Burgkmair the Elder devoted their greatest attention to graphic techniques rather than book illustration. During the mass production of printmaking, book illustration shifted its focus to representative and sumptuous codices, which continued to be produced until the 16th century. This change in the role of book illustration occurred around the same time as the transition from the Gothic period to the Renaissance.

=== Materials and techniques ===
The introduction of paper as a writing material revolutionized the book industry. Paper was invented around 100 CE by an imperial court official in China, established in Arabia in the 12th century, and reached Europe in the 13th and 14th centuries. In the 15th century, it almost completely replaced parchment and significantly reduced the cost of book production.

During the Gothic period, there was a rapid increase in book production. As books became more affordable for the broader classes, the usual level of decoration declined. The representative sumptuous codex with opaque color painting, in exceptional cases still with gilding and on parchment, increasingly became the exception. Instead, text illustration with glazed pen and ink drawings or merely unpretentious historiated initials became the norm.

As illustrated books became more common for private use in the 13th century, small-format utility manuscripts superseded large-format codices for monastic communities or the liturgy.

=== Artists and clients ===
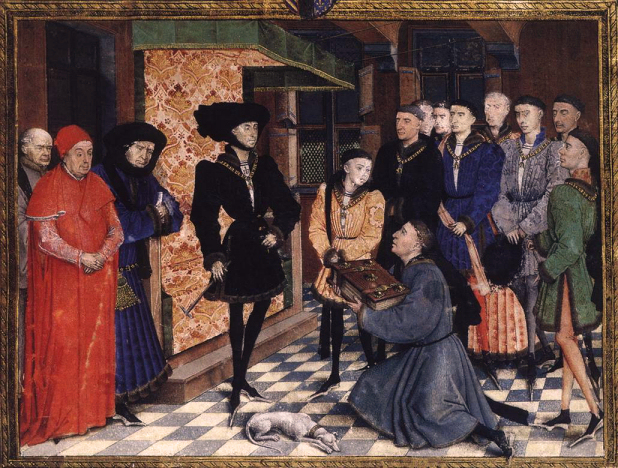
Rogier van der Weyden: Jean Wauquelin presents his work to Philip the Good, frontispiece of the Chronicles of Hainaut, (southern Netherlands, c. 1446).

During the 12th and 13th centuries, commercial book production emerged alongside monastic book production. This change was primarily driven by universities, particularly those in Paris and Bologna, yet most of the literature produced was theological and legal, and seldom illuminated. Book illustration was primarily commissioned by the high nobility, who later became patrons of secular courtly literature, and women of nobility played an important role. Over the 14th and especially the 15th century, this circle expanded to include lower and official nobility, patricians, and wealthy merchants, who commissioned primarily books of hours and other devotional texts for private use. Dedication images often depicted prominent noble clients and were placed on the first leaves of the manuscript. The trend towards increasingly realistic portraits is evident in the dedication images.

By the middle of the 13th century, the heyday of monastic scriptoria had ended in all regions. During the Gothic period, commercial ateliers emerged, and more artistic personalities began to appear by name. It became typical from the 14th century onwards to find a master who ran a workshop and was active in both panel painting and book illustration. However, the monastic scriptoria still remained productive.

Especially in the Upper German reform monasteries of the 15th century, nuns such as Sibylla von Bondorf can often be traced as book illustrators. The typical works of these "nuns' paintings" are colorful, characterized by emotional expression, and are not artistically demanding. It is not known whether nuns were also involved in prominent works produced for women's convents or to what extent women were able to work in professional studios. In any case, masterful book illustrations such as the Katharinentaler Graduale or the Wonnentaler Graduale were created for women's convents. Around 1405, the writer Christine de Pizan wrote in The Book of the City of Ladies about a female illuminator, Anastasia, who was said to have illuminated works by Christine, among others, to have outdone all the artists in Paris in painting vine leaf ornaments to decorate books and background landscapes and to have sold her works at a high price.

In the 15th century, independent workshops were established to produce inexpensive manuscripts with simple glazed pen drawings in stock, without a specific commission, and then advertised their publishing program. One of the best-known workshops of this type is that of Diebold Lauber, which can be documented in Haguenau between 1427 and 1467. Following the rapid spread of printing and graphic book illustration, some artists once again focused on representative, sumptuous manuscripts. Notable artists on the cusp of the Renaissance, such as Jan van Eyck, Jean Fouquet, and Andrea Mantegna, emerged as panel and book illustrators, running powerful workshops. As regional stylistic particularities receded, the individual mark of each artist's personality gained in importance.

=== Types of books ===
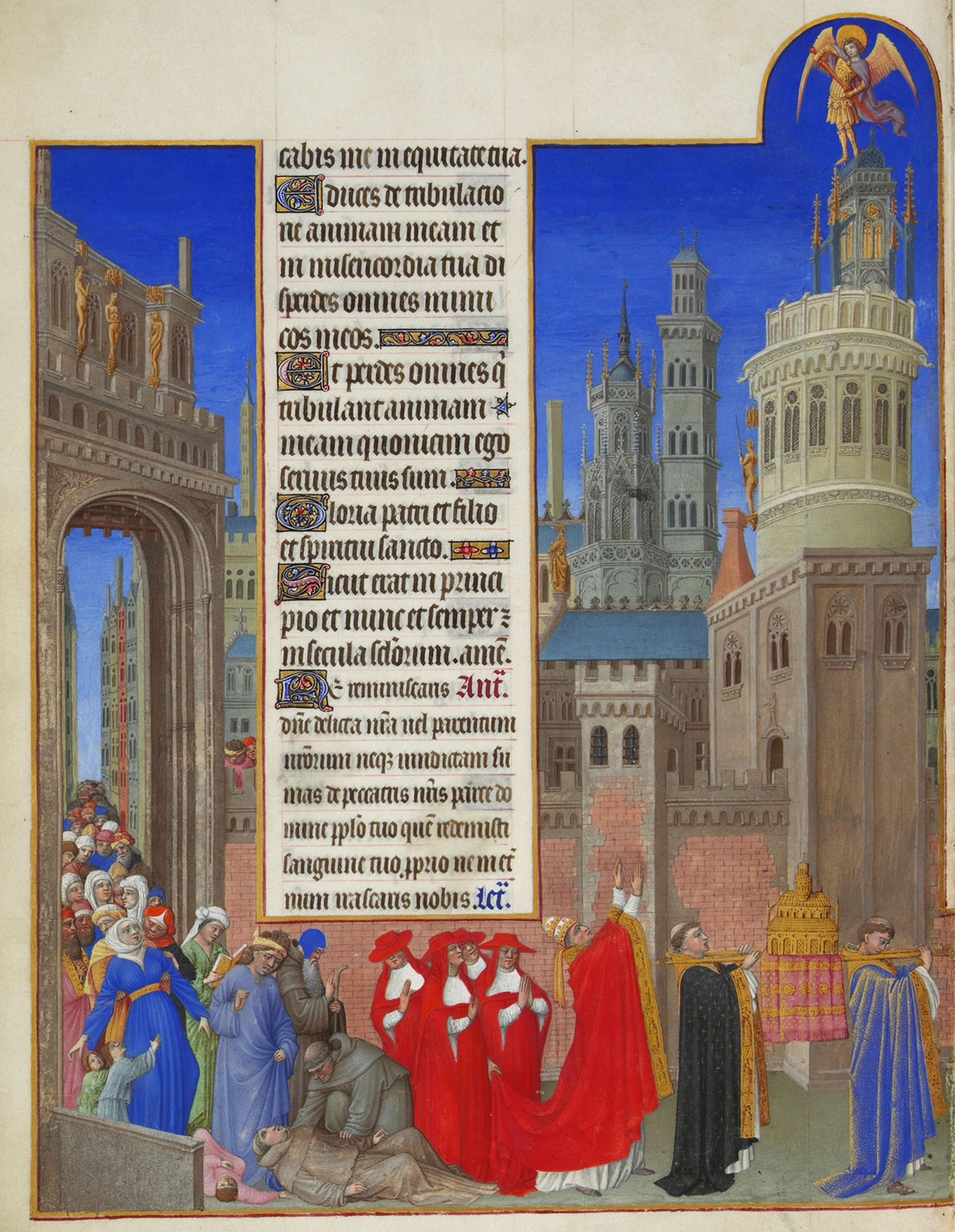

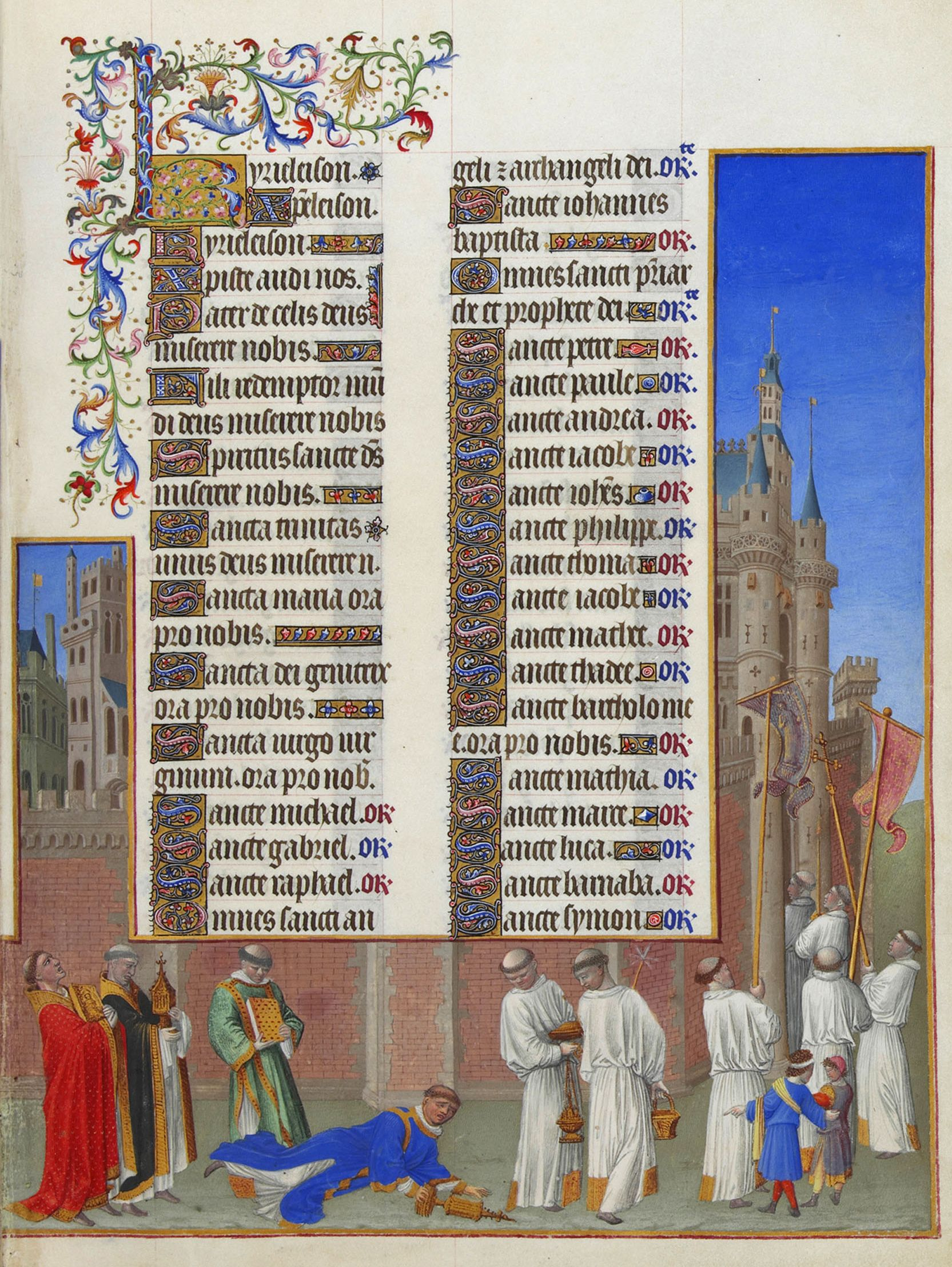

Double page from the Book of Hours of the Duke of Berry of the Limbourg brothers (France, between 1410 and 1416).

During the Gothic period, the range of illustrated texts expanded significantly. Secular, courtly literature in the vernacular became a subject of illustration from the late 12th century onwards and was placed alongside Latin liturgical texts. The only secular genre that was illuminated at the highest level with gold ground and opaque color painting was chronicles, especially universal chronicles, which combined historiography with lay religious literature. It is noteworthy that the German heroic epic was illustrated rather belatedly, infrequently, and with low standards, while the chanson de geste about the deeds of Charlemagne, which was more closely associated with historiography, was particularly lavishly decorated in France. Sumptuous manuscripts, though without gold grounds, were also produced for collections of courtly epic or lyric poetry. The Codex Manesse is a well-known example of an illustrated manuscript, produced in Zurich around 1300.

In the 13th century, illuminated non-fiction and specialized texts appeared, primarily in the university environment. In Bologna, legal books dominated. The field of law also included imperial or papal bulls, the most famous illustrated example of which is the Golden Bull of Charles IV, commissioned by King Wenceslaus in 1400. A frequently illustrated legal source for practical rather than academic use was the Sachsenspiegel by Eike of Repgow.

However, the typical illustrated manuscript of the Gothic period remained the religious book, which, in contrast to earlier times, was now primarily intended for the private devotion of lay people. In the 13th century, the psalter was the most popular book for this purpose, giving rise later to the book of hours, which became the most common type of illustrated book. Popular Bibles and the Biblia Pauperum also belong to the realm of lay devotion. In the university and monastic environment, theological treatises of the Church Fathers, the great scholastics and mystics, legends of the saints and authors of Latin and Greek antiquity were illustrated in large numbers.

=== Influences from other arts ===
While Romanesque book illustration was inspired by mural painting, Gothic book illustration was primarily inspired by stained glass, which marked the Gothic cathedrals. Book illustration directly adopted the often dominant bright reds and blues in its miniatures, at least as far as representative opaque color paintings were concerned. The inspiration of stained glass affected the patterned ground of the miniatures in particular, while gilding contributed to the luminosity of the manuscripts.

The dependence on stained glass for inspiration is particularly evident in the early Gothic French Bible moralisée, which survives in 14 manuscripts. Biblical scenes and their typological counterparts are juxtaposed in circular fields. In addition to their arrangement, the miniatures reflect the coloring and style of Gothic medallion windows in French cathedrals.

Subsequently, book illustration also transposed the tracery of Gothic cathedral architecture into its medium. Architectural sculptural forms became common as pictorial ornamentation, recalling the wimpergs, pinnacles, rose windows, gables, friezes, and trefoils of Sainte-Chapelle in Paris or the great Gothic cathedrals. The bright colors of red, blue, and gold could be a reference to the colorful decoration of Gothic cathedrals, which are almost only found in written sources but are no longer preserved in the churches.

== Style history ==
=== General stylistic features and developments ===
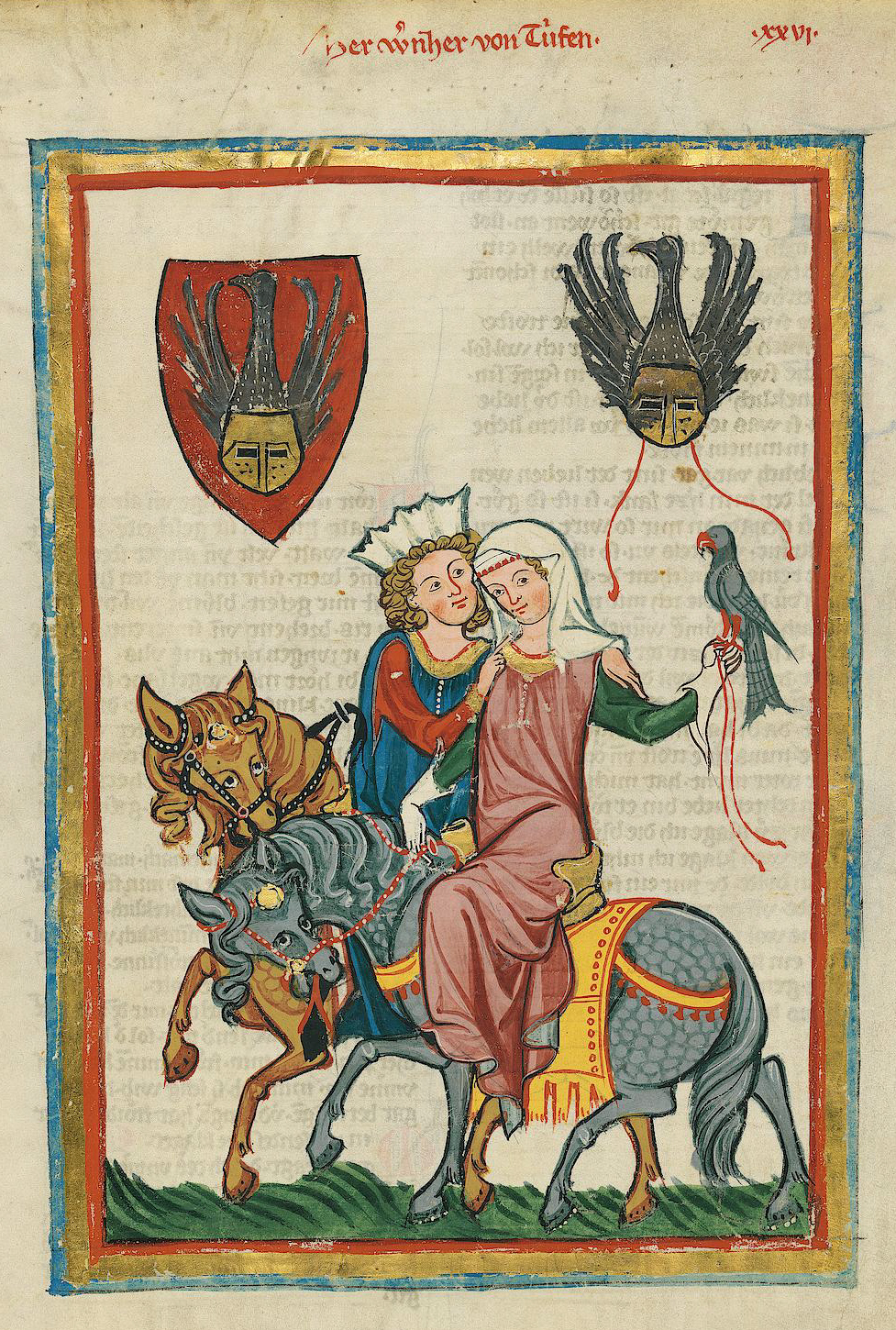
Codex Manesse (Zurich, ca. 1300).

Stylistic characteristics that remained consistent throughout the Gothic period were a soft, sweeping style with a smooth, curved linear ductus, courtly elegance, elongated figures, and flowing drapery. Another characteristic was the use of contemporary architectural elements to decoratively structure the picture fields.

From the second half of the 12th century, red and blue fleuron initials were used throughout Europe as a typical decoration in manuscripts of the lower and middle levels of ornamentation. In most Gothic manuscripts, the fleuron is the only form of decoration and was then executed by the rubricator, who was usually identical to the scribe, especially in the case of unpretentious manuscripts. The fleuron is particularly useful as a reference point for dating and locating manuscripts.

Independent scenes were inserted as historiated initials and drolleries at the bottom of the picture. They provided space for imaginative depictions unrelated to the illustrated text and contributed significantly to the individualization of painting and the rejection of rigid pictorial formulas.

Between approximately 1380 and 1420, a new visual language known as International Gothic spread throughout Europe as a result of the supra-regional marriage policy of the European noble houses and the growing mobility of artists. This style is characterized by softly flowing robe folds and hairstyles, as well as slender figures wearing courtly, tight-fitting, and high-belted robes. It was also referred to as the "soft style" due to its soft lines.

Gothic painting typically depicted figures in contemporary fashion and Gothic architecture, even in biblical events. During the 13th century, sketchbooks began to feature new creations based on studies of nature and architecture, rather than solely adopting iconographic models from other works of art. One notable example is the sketchbook of the Frenchman Villard de Honnecourt, created around 1235. On the threshold of the Renaissance, naturalistic depictions dominated based on the realism of art in the southern Netherlands. The 15th century saw the establishment of perspective, spatial depth, lighting effects, and realistic anatomy of the people depicted, which pointed towards the Renaissance.

After the diffusion of the printing press, book illustration in the second half of the 15th century once again concentrated on particularly lavish representational codices for high-ranking patrons. During the late Gothic period, the distinction between book and panel painting became increasingly blurred. Miniatures adopted the complex pictorial compositions of monumental painting and went from instructive text illustrations to largely autonomous images.

=== France ===
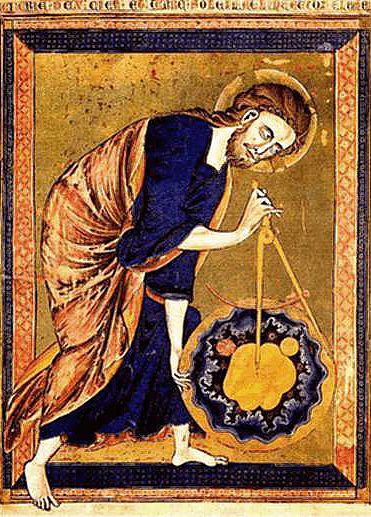
Bible moralisée, God as Architect (France, ca. 1250).

By 1200, French court culture and the fine arts had achieved dominance in the West and spread throughout Europe. This was due to several factors, including France's advanced centralization with a strong royal court, the development of a national identity, and the prestige of the University of Paris. In France, particularly in Paris, there was a significant shift in manuscript production towards professional workshops of secular artists. From the late 13th century, these workshops were concentrated in Paris's Rue Erembourg, which is now known as Rue Boutebrie, right next to the copyists and paper merchants.

The Ingeborg Psalter, produced in Tournai, and the Bible moralisée are notable examples of early Gothic book illustration. These manuscripts mark a transition of the Romanesque visual tradition to a more classical phase, featuring figures with softly flowing, pleated robes, finely modeled faces, and a new sense of corporeality.

The new style developed until approximately 1250, at which point it had acquired all of its essential characteristics, marking the beginning of the High Gothic period. Examples from the third quarter of the 13th century that exemplify this style include the Psalter of Saint Louis, the Sainte-Chapelle Gospels, and the Roman de la Poire.

In the late 13th century, Master Honoré initiated the emergence of a new and distinguished type of artist: the court painter, who worked exclusively for the king or a prince. Master Honoré was the first documented court painter and the first known book illustrator in France. He and his contemporaries aimed to give their paintings a three-dimensional quality, creating works that resemble sculptures and reliefs in the way they model robes, faces, and hair. An excellent example of this style from Honoré's workshop is the Breviary of Philip the Fair, dating from around 1290.

The Book of Hours of Jeanne d'Evreux, a small-format manuscript illuminated by the court painter Jean Pucelle around 1324–1328, contains the first truly three-dimensional depiction of an interior space north of the Alps. Pucelle introduced France to Italian Trecento art and the grisaille technique, which remained popular throughout the 14th century and was adopted by his students, including Jean le Noir. Additionally, Pucelle had a significant impact on the high Gothic framing style, characterized by leafy tendrils and drolleries that highlight both the image and the text. Pucelle is also noteworthy as the first book illustrator for whom several documents and colophons from 1325 to 1334 provide information. It is known that he employed at least three people in his workshop.

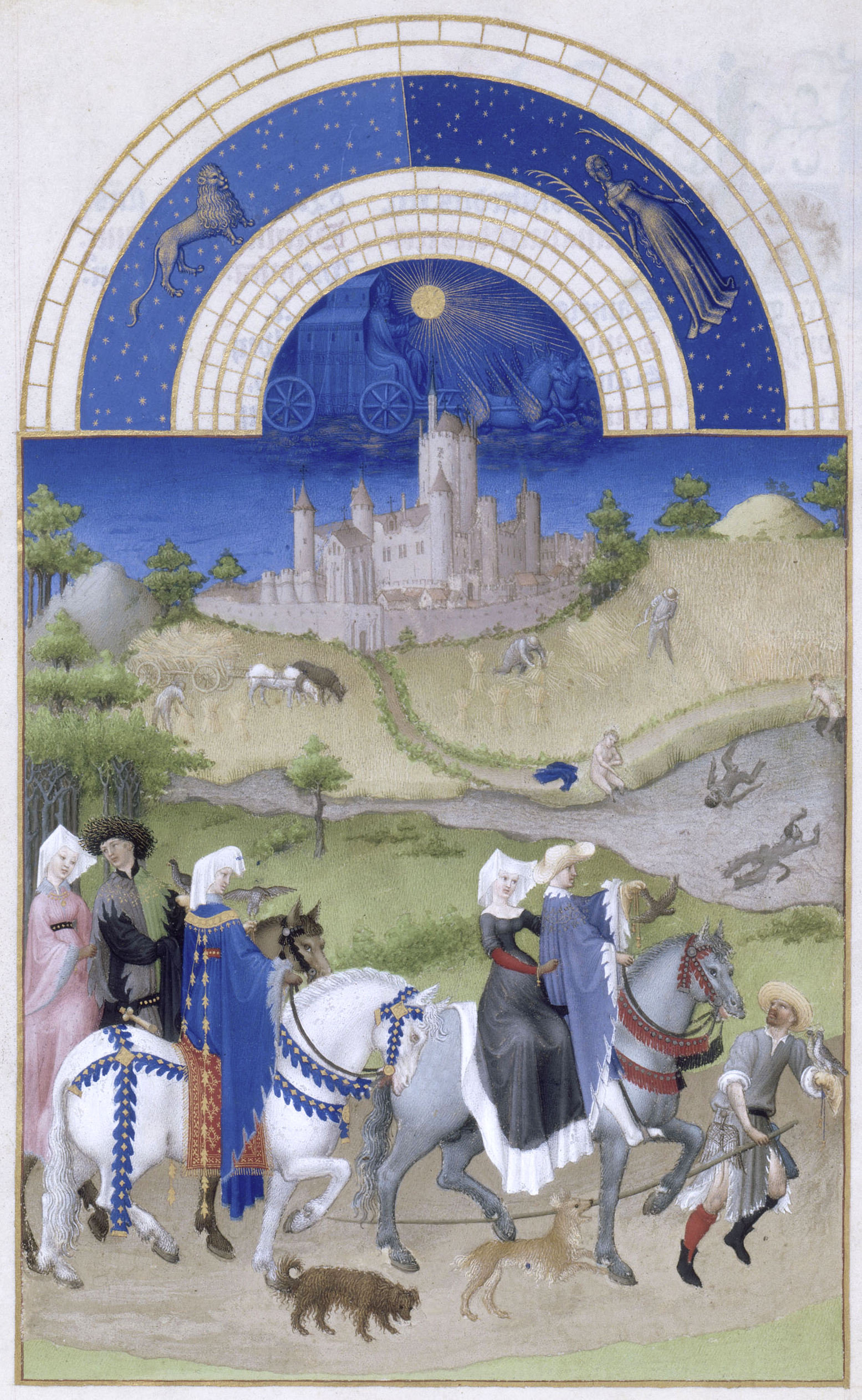
Limbourg brothers: Book of Hours of the Duke of Berry, monthly picture of August (France, between 1410 and 1416).

During the period of King Charles V's reign from 1364 to 1380, book illustration was significantly influenced by his patronage. He is considered one of the greatest bibliophiles of the Middle Ages. Charles attracted foreign artists to Paris, including Jean de Bondol from Bruges and Zebo da Firenze, which played a major role in turning Paris into an international center of book illustration. This center absorbed new impulses and radiated throughout Europe. Jean de Berry and Philip the Bold, the brothers of the king, were also significant patrons of the arts. The Duke of Berry was served by André Beauneveu and Jacquemart de Hesdin from Flemish Artois, as well as the Limbourg brothers, who created the most famous illustrated manuscript of the 15th century, the Book of Hours of the Duke of Berry, between 1410 and 1416. This manuscript contains the first realistic landscape paintings in art north of the Alps.

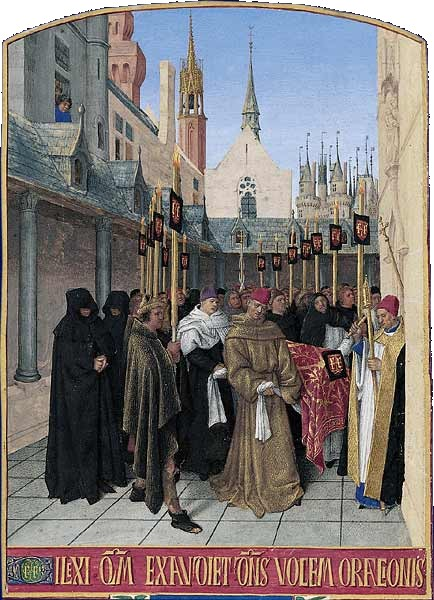
Jean Fouquet: Hours of Étienne Chevalier, (France, before 1457, funeral procession).

The Boucicaut Master, who worked in Paris between 1405 and 1420, introduced the first central perspective interiors. He and the Limbourg brothers developed the acanthus vine as a dominant decorative motif in French book illustration. The Bedford Master, who worked in Paris from 1405 to 1465, combined the main miniatures with the surrounding marginal scenes as a thematic unit. Jean de Bondol was unafraid to depict even the king in an unidealized way in a dedication painting and to introduce portraiture that approximated reality into book illustration. Together, the Limbourg brothers, the Boucicaut Master, the Bedford Master and Jean Bondol marked a new realistic turn in Gothic book illustration, which productively transformed Italian Trecento art and International Gothic. Another contemporary was the Rohan Master, who, however, took a unique approach and deviated from the typical conventions of French book illustration.

Besides the dominant center of Paris, only the papal residence of Avignon was able to assert itself as an independent center of art in the 14th century. In the second quarter of the 15th century, however, as a result of France's defeat by England in the Hundred Years' War and the resulting weakness of the royal family - the royal court was forced to relocate to Touraine - Paris lost its vital position as a center of art in favor of the Loire region and western France, where princely courts competed with the king's splendor and attracted important artists as court painters. Even in Paris, for instance, the Bedford Master was not in the service of the king but of the English governor, the Duke of Bedford.

Immediately after the middle of the century, a new style emerged, strongly influenced by the realism of the art from the southern Netherlands. The Master of Jouvenel, who can be traced back to between 1447 and 1460, leads to Jean Fouquet of Tours, who became the pre-eminent artistic figure in France in the third quarter of the 15th century. His major works include the Hours of Étienne Chevalier and the Grandes Chroniques de France. With Fouquet, French painting stood on the threshold between the Gothic and Renaissance periods. His work is considered an independent synthesis of the French painting tradition, the early Italian Renaissance of the Quattrocento, and Dutch realism. Especially the perspective constructions, the use of light and the historical accuracy of his paintings make Fouquet one of the most important painters of his time.

The only illuminator of Fouquet's rank was Barthélemy d'Eyck from the Netherlands, who illustrated the Book of the Love-Burnt Heart for René of Anjou between 1457 and 1470. After Fouquet, only a few individual illuminators remain, including Jean Colombe in Bourges, Jean Bourdichon in Tours and Maître François in Paris.

=== England ===
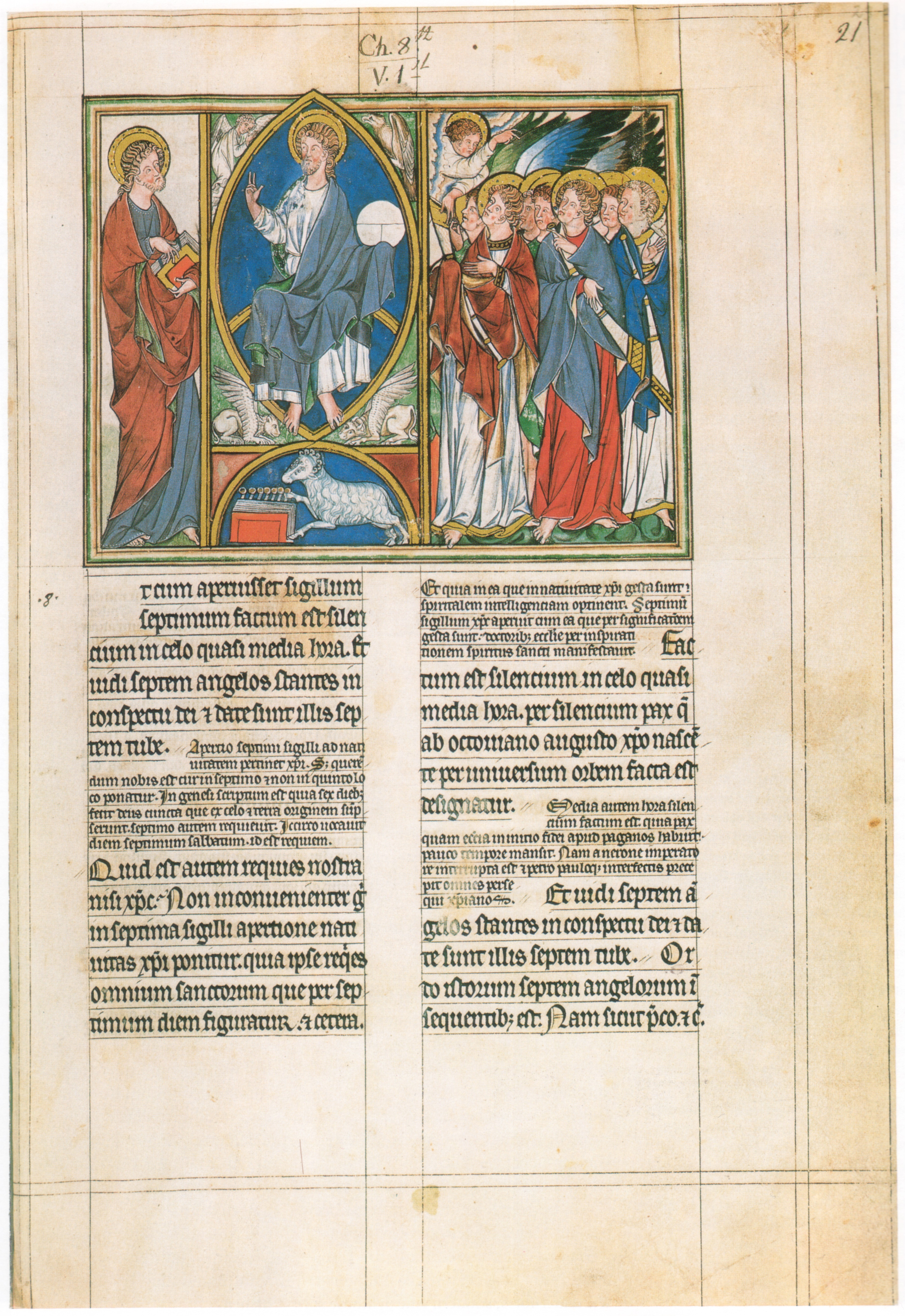
The Douce Apocalypse (London, Westminster Court School, 1270–1272).

Around 1220, the gradual transition from Romanesque to Gothic book illustration took place in England. The strongest connection to French book illustration can be seen in the studios around the English court, which, however, played a minor role as patron of illuminated manuscripts compared to the French kings. The grotesque animals and bizarre figures of the drolleries, largely detached from the text, are characteristic of English book illustration, especially between about 1280 and 1340. In addition to illustrations in opaque color painting with a gold ground, English book illustration continued the technique of color drawing, which was particularly widespread in the British Isles.

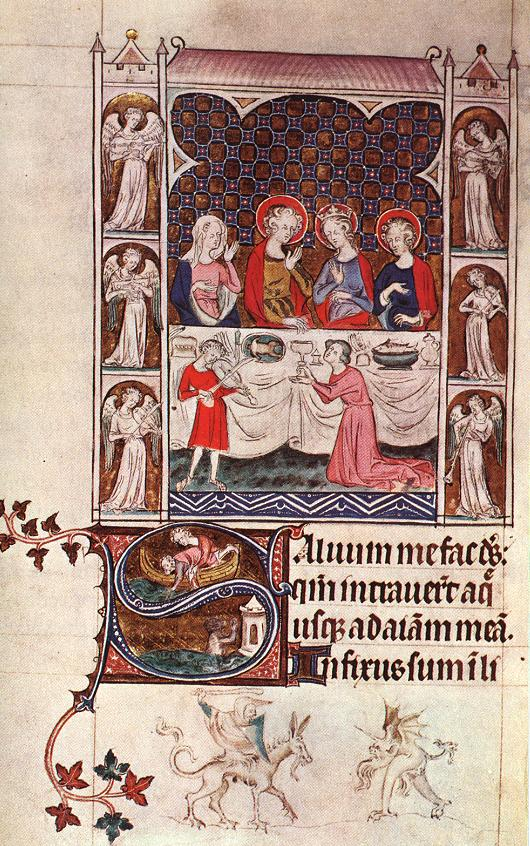
Queen Mary Psalter ( ca. 1310) with historiated initial and drolleries

Matthew Paris, a Benedictine monk from the monastery of St. Albans, was a distinguished author, scribe, and illuminator who belonged to the closest circle of advisors to King Henry III. His main work is the Chronica majora, which he illustrated in part with glazed pen-and-ink drawings, some of which were based on his own eyewitness accounts. The Salisbury scriptorium was based on the style of St. Albans. In the second third of the 13th century, workshops based on the Parisian model were established around the University of Oxford, where William de Brailes worked and signed several of his miniatures around the mid-13th century, making him one of the few known illuminators of the period. There were also important workshops in London, where there were particularly wealthy buyers.

The most frequently illustrated type of book in English Gothic was the psalter, even after the Book of Hours had long since established itself on the continent in the 14th century. Among the most important 13th-century English Gothic psalters are the Westminster Psalter, several Peterborough psalters, a mid-13th-century illustrated copy for a nun in Amesbury, a psalter for an abbot in Evesham, the unusually richly decorated Oscott Psalter, possibly illuminated around 1270 for the future Pope Adrian V, and the Alphonso Psalter. From the 14th century, the Ormesby Psalter, the Luttrell Psalter, the Gorleston Psalter, the De Lisle Psalter, the Peterborough Psalter and, above all, the particularly ornate Queen Mary Psalter stand out. In addition, Bibles and individual books of the Bible were among the main types of books favored by English book illustrators, especially the illuminated Apocalypse manuscripts of the 13th century, such as the Trinity College Apocalypse (1242–1250), the Lambeth Apocalypse (1260–1270), and the Douce Apocalypse (1270–1272). Other subjects of book illustration were legends of saints and bestiaries.

In the 14th century, London became the most important center of English book illustration, with the royal court playing a leading role in its promotion. Westminster in particular attracted artists from a variety of backgrounds and developed its singular approach, first the Court Style, then the Queen Mary Style. At the end of the 14th century, Richard II in particular sponsored book illustration. In East Anglia, important illuminated manuscripts with vivid, naturalistic detail were produced for the Bohun family.

Around 1400, a form of International Gothic also became dominant in England. The numerous large-format manuscripts that were increasingly produced around this time are striking. In the 15th century, English book illustration was particularly influenced by Flemish and Lower Rhine illustrated manuscripts, which were imported in large numbers. The illuminator Herman Scheerre, who probably came from the Lower Rhine, played an important role in the first half of the 15th century.

The dissolution of monasteries in 1536-40 and reformist hostility to images in the 16th and 17th centuries caused severe losses.

=== The Netherlands ===
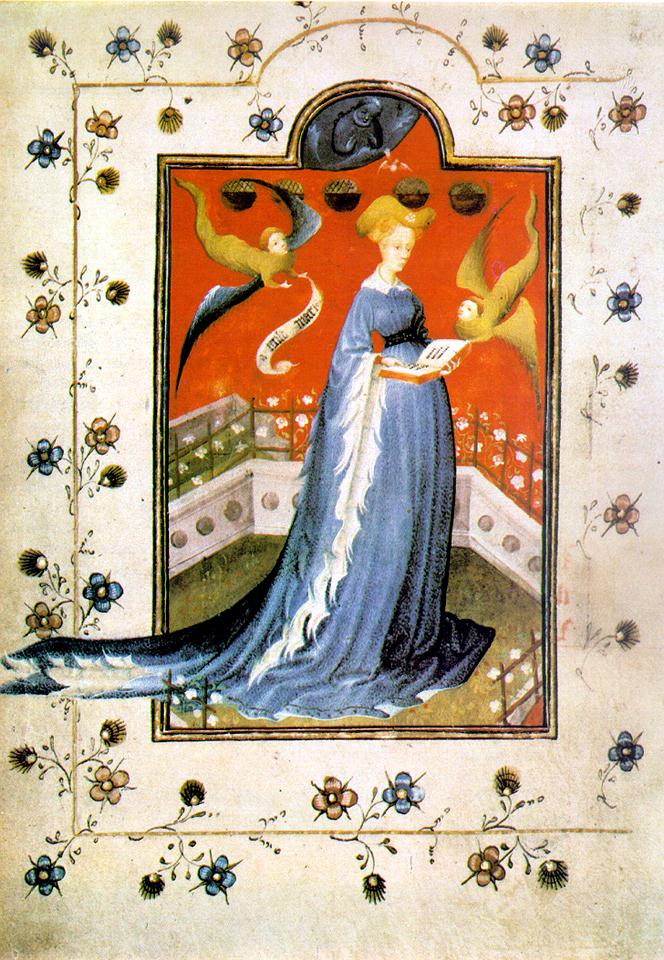
Depiction of Mary of Guelders in the "Soft Style" (Marienborn near Arnhem, 1415).

Throughout the Middle Ages, the southern Netherlands, including Flanders and Brabant, dominated the Dutch region economically and culturally. Parts of the Southern Netherlands belonged to the French crown and were closely linked to France as the Burgundian Netherlands from the 14th century. As a result, the French Gothic style was particularly strong in the southern Netherlands in the 13th century. Here, the transition from Romanesque to Gothic art was completed around 1250. Since Carolingian times, the Meuse region, especially the diocese of Liège, had played an important role as an intermediary between French and German book art. In the 14th century, Maastricht surpassed the episcopal city of Liège with numerous biblical illustrations, lives of saints, as well as secular works. A third center was Sint-Truiden.

Since Flemish book illustration in the 13th century was still completely under the influence and shadow of Paris, the great French patrons of the 14th century often brought Flemish masters such as Jean de Bondol, André Beauneveu or Jacquemart de Hesdin to Paris. Probably under Italian influence, three-dimensional space became an important theme in Dutch book illustration. The desire for greater fidelity to nature also affected the depiction of people. Around 1375–1420, the International Style became dominant in the Netherlands.

The 15th century was the golden age of Flemish book illustration. Leading artists working in France, such as the Limbourg brothers or later Barthélemy d'Eyck, came from the Netherlands, but it was under the reign of Philip the Good and Charles the Bold that the Flemish cities experienced their greatest economic and cultural prosperity. Philip, in particular, attracted outstanding artists such as Loyset Liédet, Willem Vrelant, and Jan Le Tavernier to his court in Bruges. A series of illuminated manuscripts from Valenciennes dating from 1458 to 1489 are attributed to Simon Marmion and show influences from the landscape paintings of Dierick Bouts. The illusionism of Netherlandish book illustration was enhanced by the anonymous Master of Mary of Burgundy through trompe-l'œil effects.

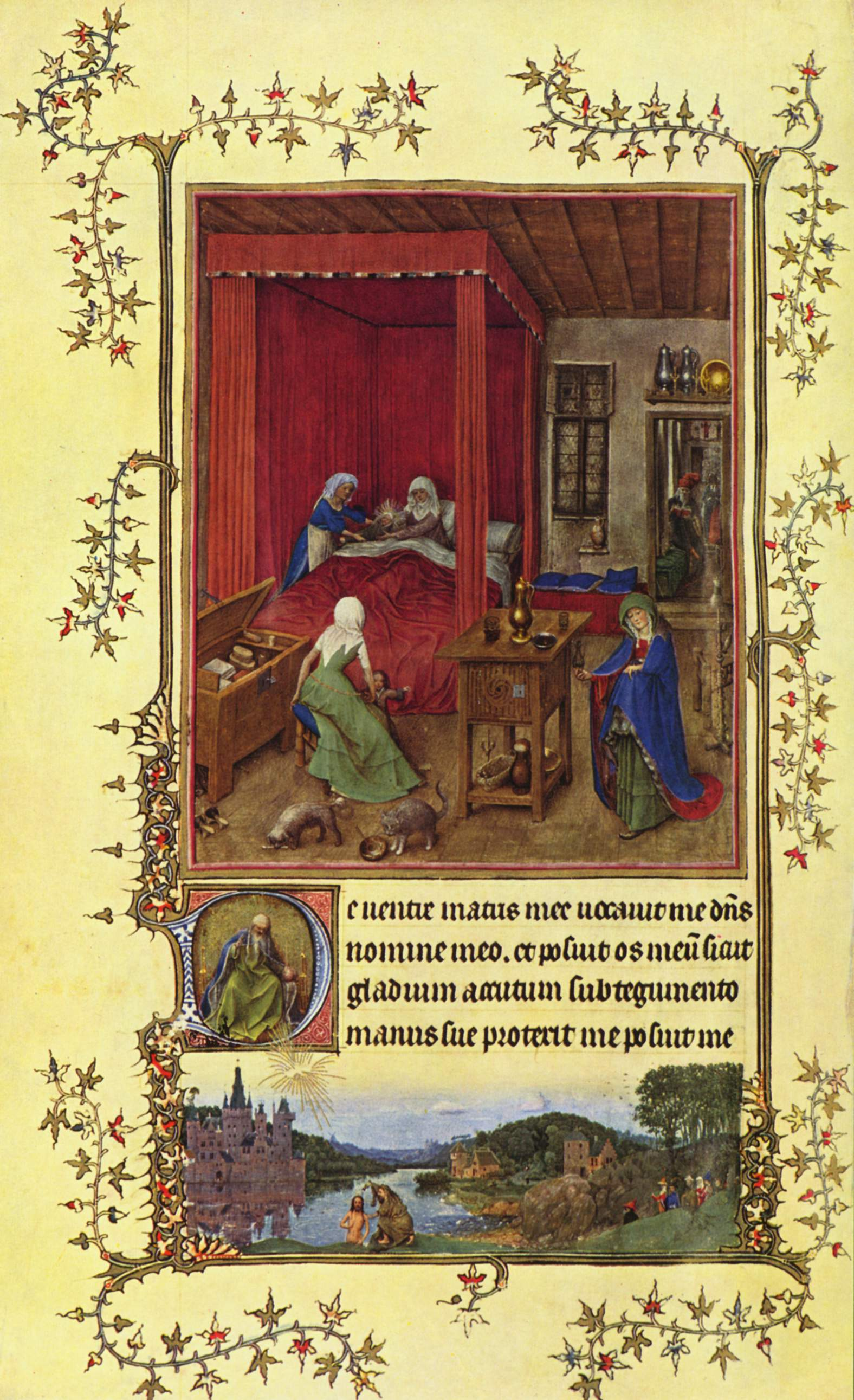
Master "G" of the Turin-Milan Hours, identical with Jan van Eyck, Birth of John the Baptist (Flanders, 1422–1424).

By this time, French art lost its influence and Early Netherlandish painting developed a unique style characterized by painting based on observations of nature. The most significant innovation was the replacement of medieval gold grounds with realistic landscapes as the background of the picture. Through the careful observation of nature, the movement and surface character of the human body, as well as the plasticity of inanimate objects, were precisely reproduced through closely studied and effectively applied light effects. During this period, Jan van Eyck was a central figure in the fundamental renewal of art, who worked as an illuminator himself and illuminated the Turin-Milan Book of Hours.

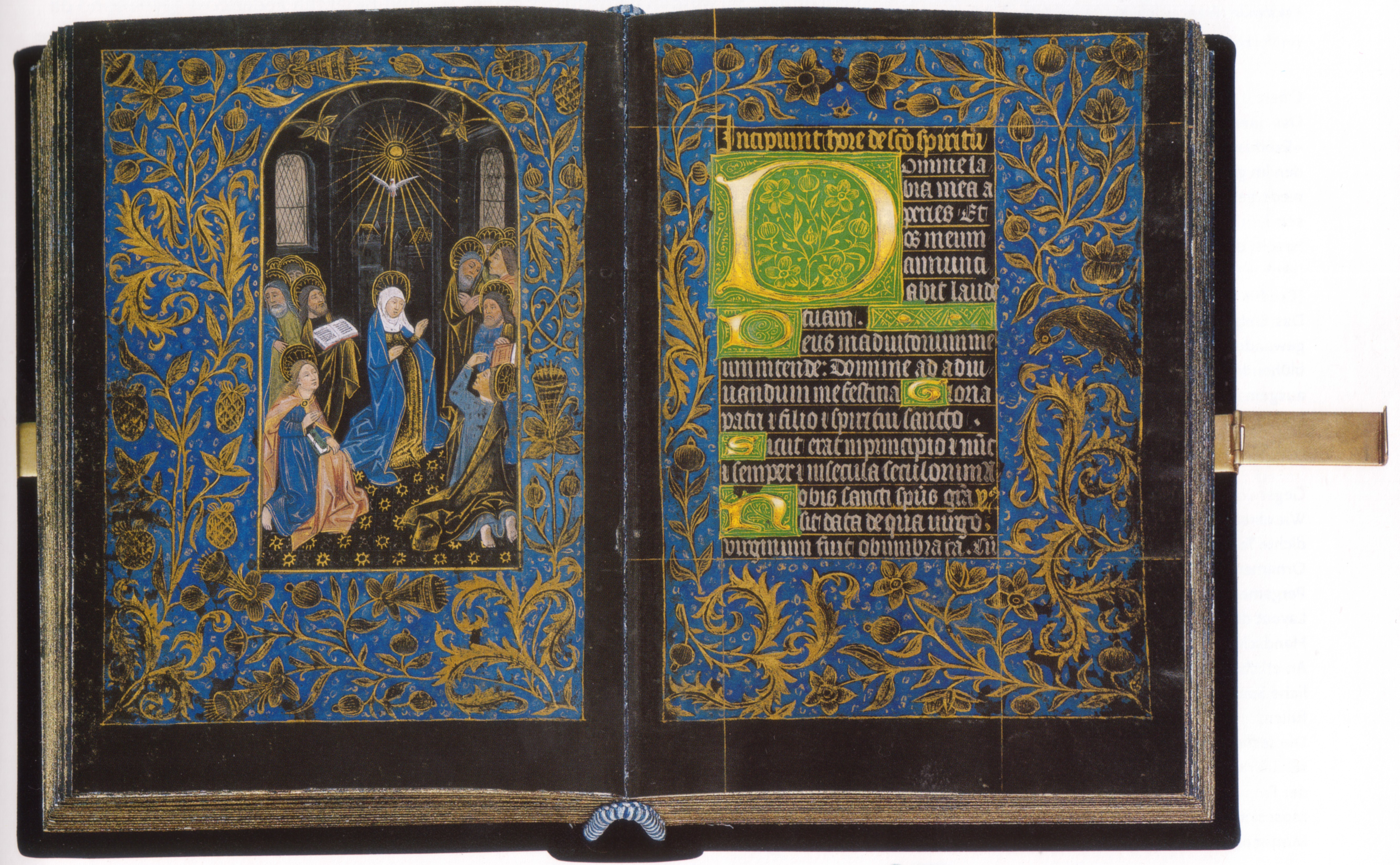
Black Hours, Morgan MS 493 with colored parchment (Bruges, ca. 1475).

Following the death of Charles the Bold in 1477 and the collapse of the House of Burgundy, the domestic market for Netherlandish artists abruptly vanished. Consequently, artists such as Simon Bening and the Master of the Dresden Prayerbook began exporting high-quality books of hours as luxury goods to all European countries. The Flemish workshops not only had a high standard of performance but were also well-organized production centers capable of producing devotional books in large quantities for a wide range of customers. The colorful and naturalistic book illustrations of this Ghent-Bruges school were on the dawn of Renaissance painting.

Only a few significant Gothic manuscripts were produced in the northern Netherlands, with Utrecht being the most important center. The Premonstratensian abbey of Marienweerd, located nearby, produced a rhyme Bible by Jacob van Maerlant and a 14th-century illuminated manuscript by the same painter, Der naturen bloeme. Around 1440, an anonymous master in Utrecht produced the Hours of Catherine of Cleves, which contains over 150 miniatures and is considered the most magnificent and imaginative example of northern book illustration. The book was strongly influenced by Flemish panel painting, especially that of Robert Campin. The Master of the Saint Bartholomew Altarpiece was also active as a book and panel painter in Utrecht and Cologne between 1470 and 1510. In Holland, engraving became more prevalent than book illustration towards the end of the 15th century. An overview of Northern Netherlandish Gothic art strongly points out the effects of the iconoclasm of the Reformation in the 16th century.

=== German language area ===
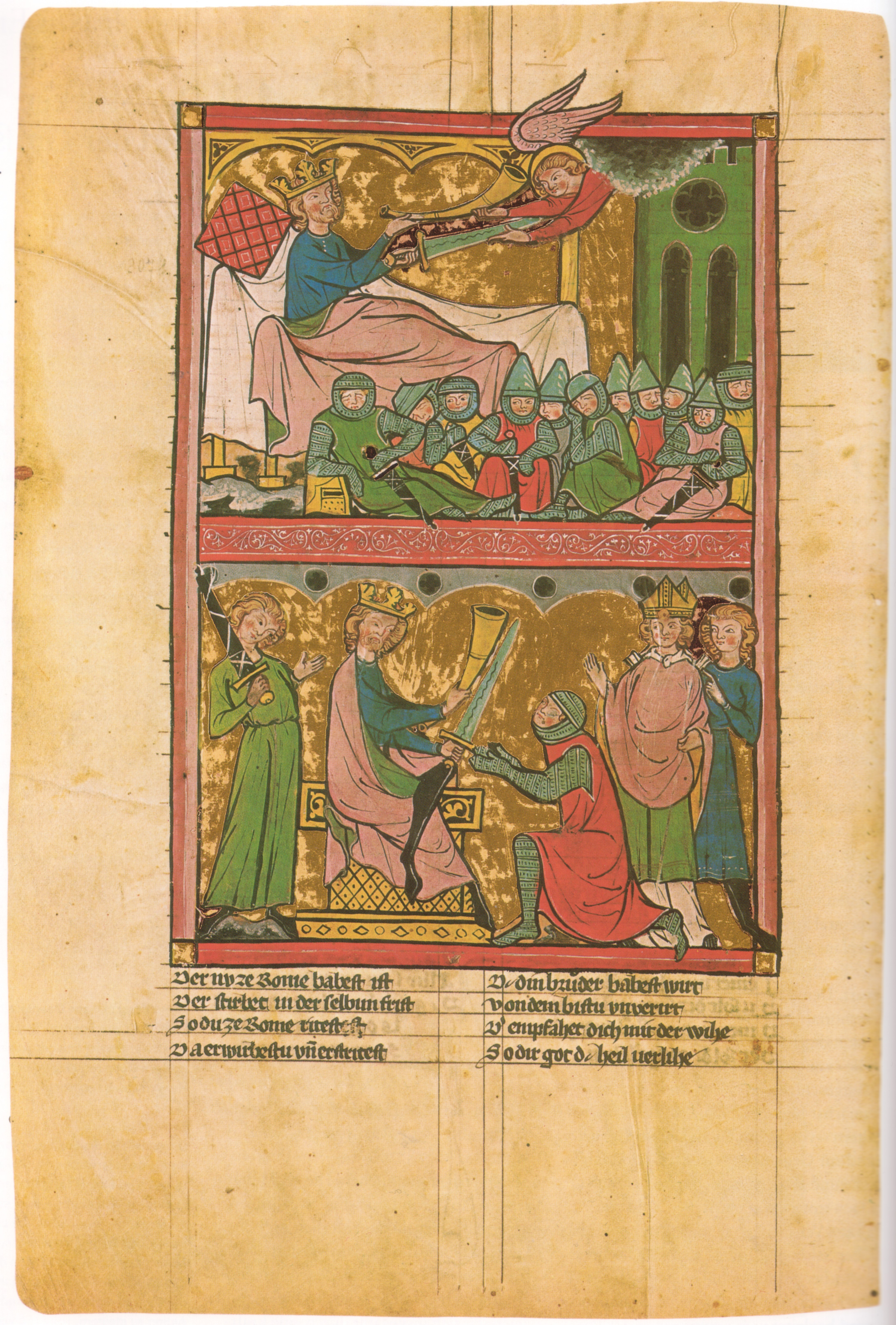
Universal Chronicle by Rudolf von Ems and "Karl" from Der Stricker (Upper Rhine, c. 1300).

The "jagged style", characterized by the sharp-edged design of the robes and influenced by Gothic architecture, led to Gothic painting in the German-speaking world. It was established in all German regions around 1300. Book illustration was dominated by monastic scriptoria for a longer period in Germany compared to France, and commercial workshops only gained prominence relatively late.

The Upper Rhine, Lake Constance, and the Lower Rhine cultural area were the first to adopt new stylistic elements from France. Alsace, with Strasbourg as the undisputed center of German Gothic in the 13th century, played a central role in Franco-German cultural exchange. Lorraine, where Metz was an important producer of books of hours, and the Meuse region around Liège also played important mediating roles. South of Lake Constance, the Codex Manesse, a collection of 137 poetic images, was produced between 1300 and 1340 in Zurich. It is an important textual witness to Middle High German Minnesang. Other notable codices were also produced in the region between Konstanz and Zurich in the first half of the 14th century. Two manuscripts containing the Universal Chronicle of Rudolf von Ems in connection with "Karl" by the Der Stricker and the Katharinentaler Graduale are among them.

Two Franco-Flemish influenced graduals illuminated by Johannes von Valkenburg in Cologne in 1299 are considered important early Gothic works. After 1400, Cologne, which had become one of the largest cities in Europe and already was a university city since 1388, regained its status as a center of book art. Stefan Lochner worked here not only as a panel painter but also as a book illuminator.

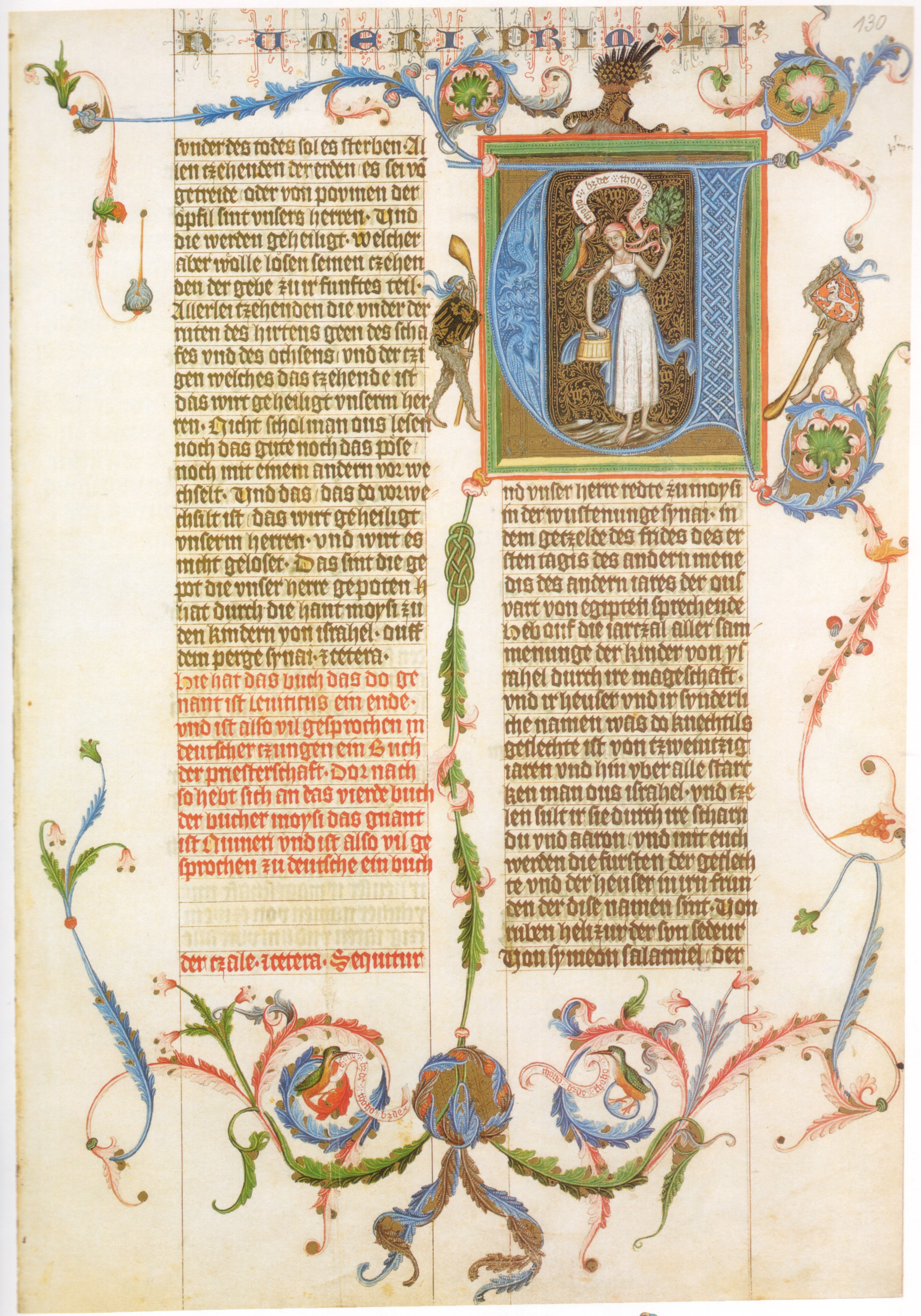
Wenceslas Bible (Prague, 1389–1400).

During the 14th century, the Gothic style spread to the eastern regions. Austrian monastery scriptoria, such as St. Florian, Kremsmünster, Admont, Seitenstetten, Lilienfeld, Zwettl, and Klosterneuburg, were influenced by Italy and gradually developed a realistic style around the year 1330. In 1380, Albert III established a courtly illuminator's workshop in Vienna, which remained active until the mid-15th century. After a brief hiatus, book illustration experienced a revival during the reign of Emperor Maximilian I, reaching new heights and completing the stylistic shift towards the Renaissance. Simultaneously, book printing and printmaking gained importance under Maximilian, exemplified by the printed edition of Theuerdank.

In the second half of the 14th century, Bohemia also experienced a peak in courtly book illustration at the court of the Luxembourgs under Emperor Charles IV and King Wenceslaus. Prague had become the political and cultural center of the empire and was home to the first German university since 1348. The Wenceslas workshop produced exceptional examples of Gothic book illustration between 1387 and 1405. These include the six-volume Wenceslas Bible, the Golden Bull, and a manuscript of Willehalm. It is worth noting that the work during this period is highly regarded for its quality and attention to detail.

=== Italy ===
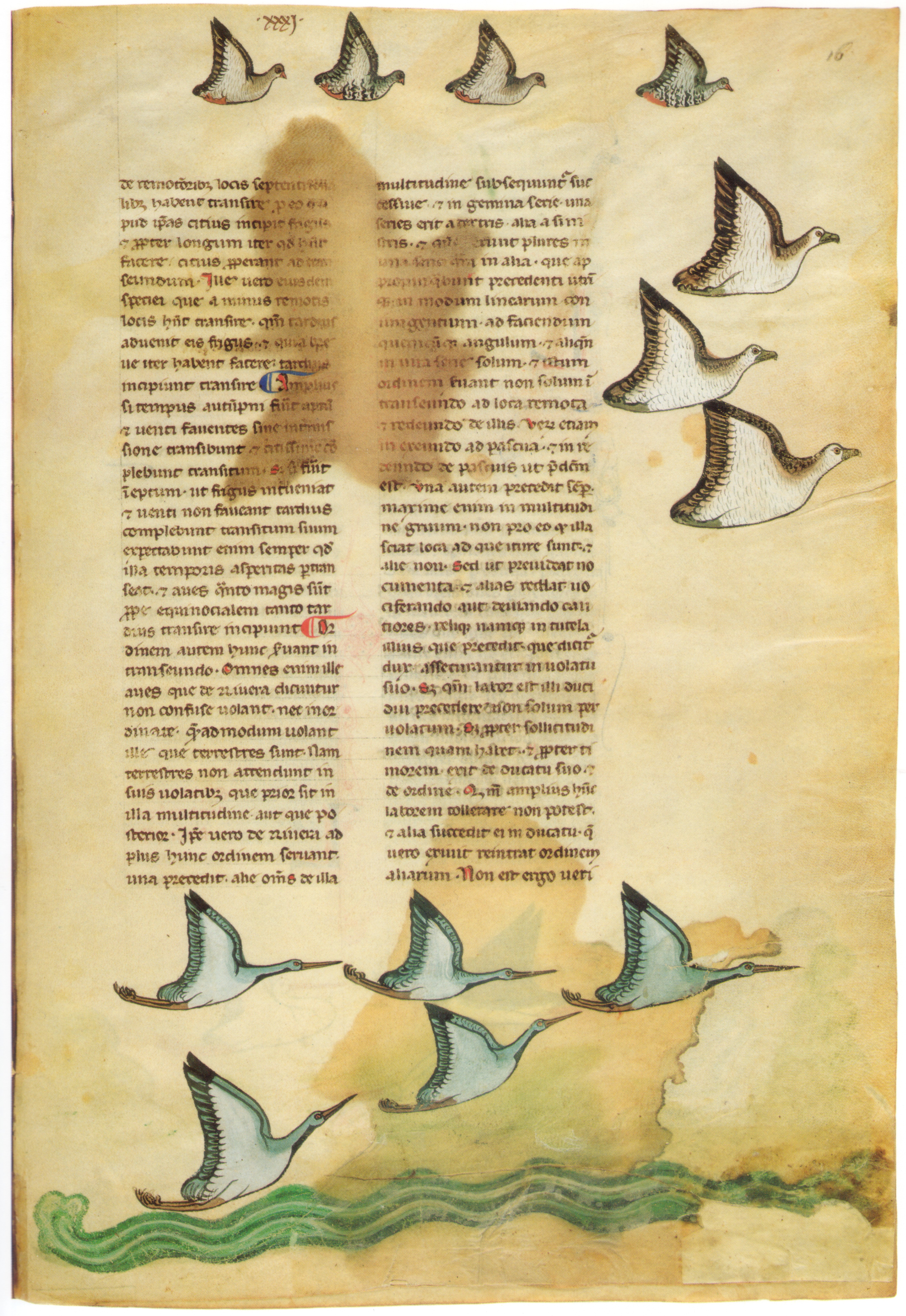
De arte venandi cum avibus (Southern Italy third quarter of the 13th century).

Italian book illustration, at first, was heavily influenced by Byzantine art, which dominated the field for a long time in both Venice and Southern Italy. One notable example of this style is the Epistolary by Giovanni da Gaibana from Padua, dated 1259. German artistic influences had also made their way to Southern Italy by the early 13th century, likely through the Hohenstaufen dynasty. The Hohenstaufen dynasty is associated with the illustration of several famous factual texts, including De arte venandi cum avibus (On the art of hunting with birds) and De balneis puteolanis, both from the second half of the 13th century. The former is illustrated with naturalistic studies of birds of prey, while the latter provides insight into the thermal baths of Pozzuoli. Notably, the falcon book demonstrates the influence of Islamic book art on southern Italian book illustration, likely transmitted through Sicily. During the Trecento and Quattrocento periods, numerous cities became art centers that encouraged art as a means of representation and competed to attract the best artists. Although French influence initially dominated Italian book illustration in the early 14th century, independent styles emerged in various regions, and individual artistic personalities began to rise. During this period, the relationship between monumental painting and book illustration became stronger, and miniature art increasingly adopted the compositional schemes of large-format painting. Italian literature, which was flourishing, required new illustration schemes. In the 14th century, vernacular works such as Dante's Divine Comedy or Giovanni Boccaccio's Decameron became increasingly popular and were frequently illustrated.

In Rome and the monasteries of Lazio, the antique heritage was still dominant and hindered the productive assimilation of Gothic formal elements for a long time. The transfer of the papal seat to Avignon in France resulted in the loss of this crucial patronage between 1309 and 1377.

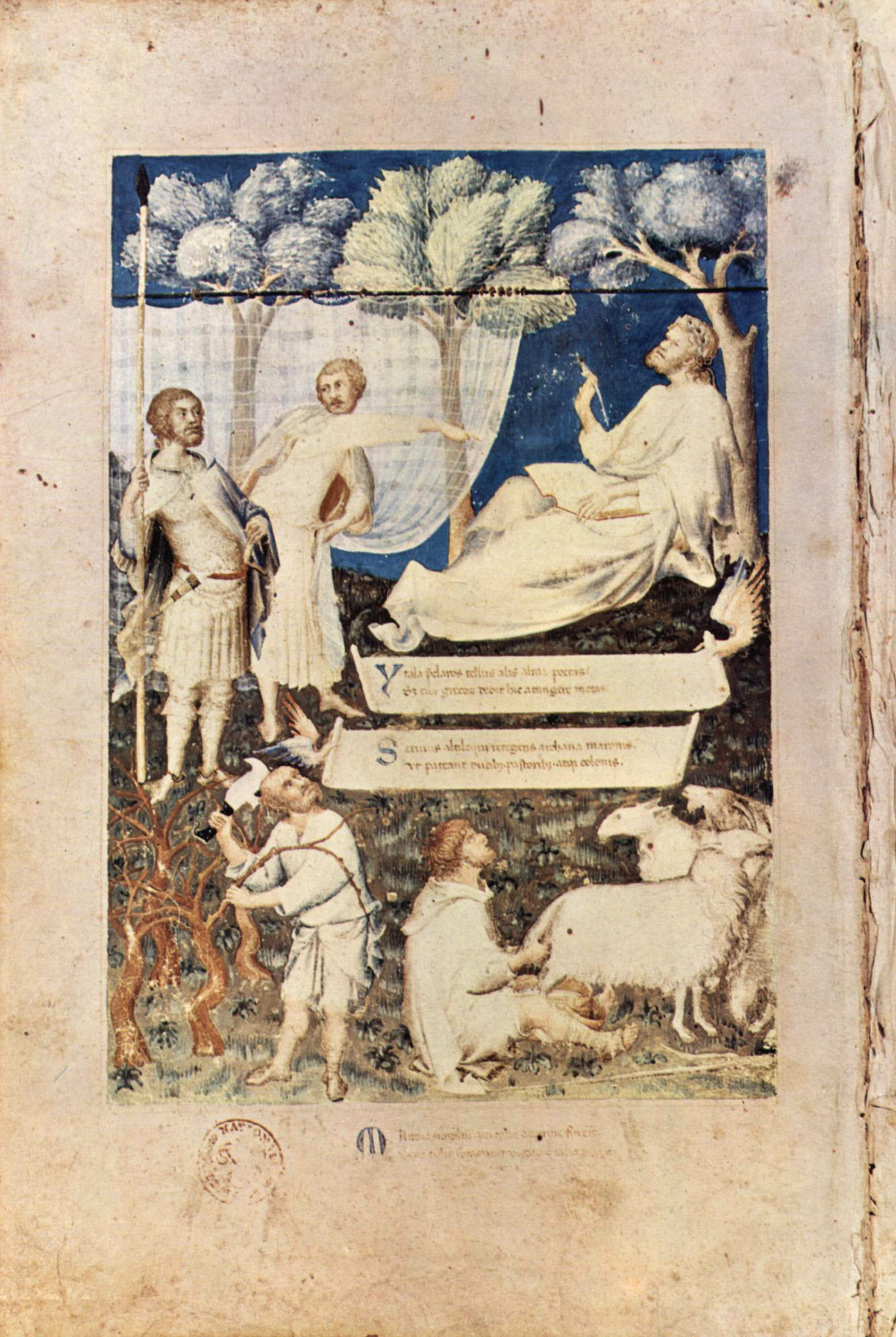
Simone Martini: Frontispiece of the Codex Ambrosianus owned by Petrarch, Virgil with allegories (Siena, c. 1340).

However, the centers of Italian book illustration were the northern Italian cities of Milan and Pavia, which were ruled by the Visconti family and heavily influenced by French art. The Visconti court, which had dynastic ties to Burgundy, primarily produced courtly chivalric romances such as Tristan and Lancelot. One of the outstanding book illuminators towards the end of the 14th century was Giovannino de' Grassi, who illustrated an Officium and a Breviarum Ambrosianum for Gian Galeazzo Visconti. Belbello da Pavia and Michelino da Besozzo were also painters in the service of the Visconti family.

In Bologna, a book illustration scene developed around the university. Its first notable representatives were Oderisio da Gubbio, who was celebrated by Dante, and Niccolò di Giacomo. The university also produced new types of books, especially legal books for the Faculty of Law, but also texts by classical authors.

In Central Italy during the 14th century, a more lifelike and vernacular style of illustration became prevalent in a bourgeois environment. This style was embodied by Domenico Lenzi from Florence. Pacino di Bonaguida's miniatures show the earliest reception of Giotto's spatial pictorial concept. Another artist is Bernardo Daddi, who is considered one of the most original of this period, and his main work is the Biadaiolo. Florentine illuminators frequently omitted decorative ornamentation and focused solely on illustrating the text. Simone Martini, originally from Siena, primarily produced large-scale paintings but also worked as a miniaturist. One of his notable works includes the frontispiece of the Codex Ambrosianus, which he painted around 1340 for Petrarch.

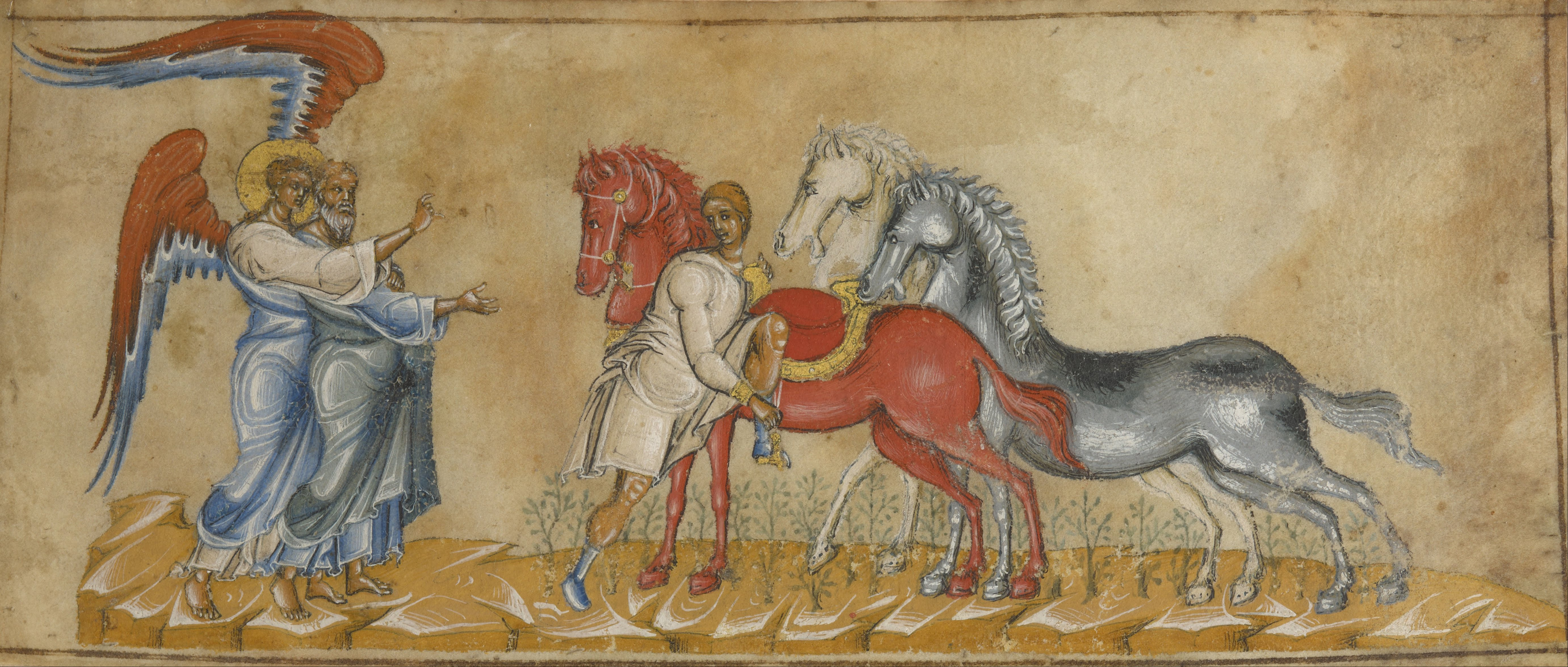
"The Vision of Zechariah", from a Sicilian manuscript from around 1300, on display at the Getty Museum in California.

=== Spain and Portugal ===
Until the High Middle Ages, Spain and Portugal were dominated by the Moors, and Christian art remained largely isolated from developments in the rest of Europe. By the mid-13th century, however, the Reconquista had brought the Iberian Peninsula back under Christian control, except for Granada. As a result, the art of the four kingdoms of Catalonia-Aragon, Castile-León, Portugal, and Navarre slowly opened up to European influences. From the 13th century, artists from France, the Netherlands, and Italy came mainly to the Castilian court in Madrid and the Catalan commercial metropolis of Barcelona. The Kingdom of Mallorca was particularly open to French and Italian influences until the mid-14th century.

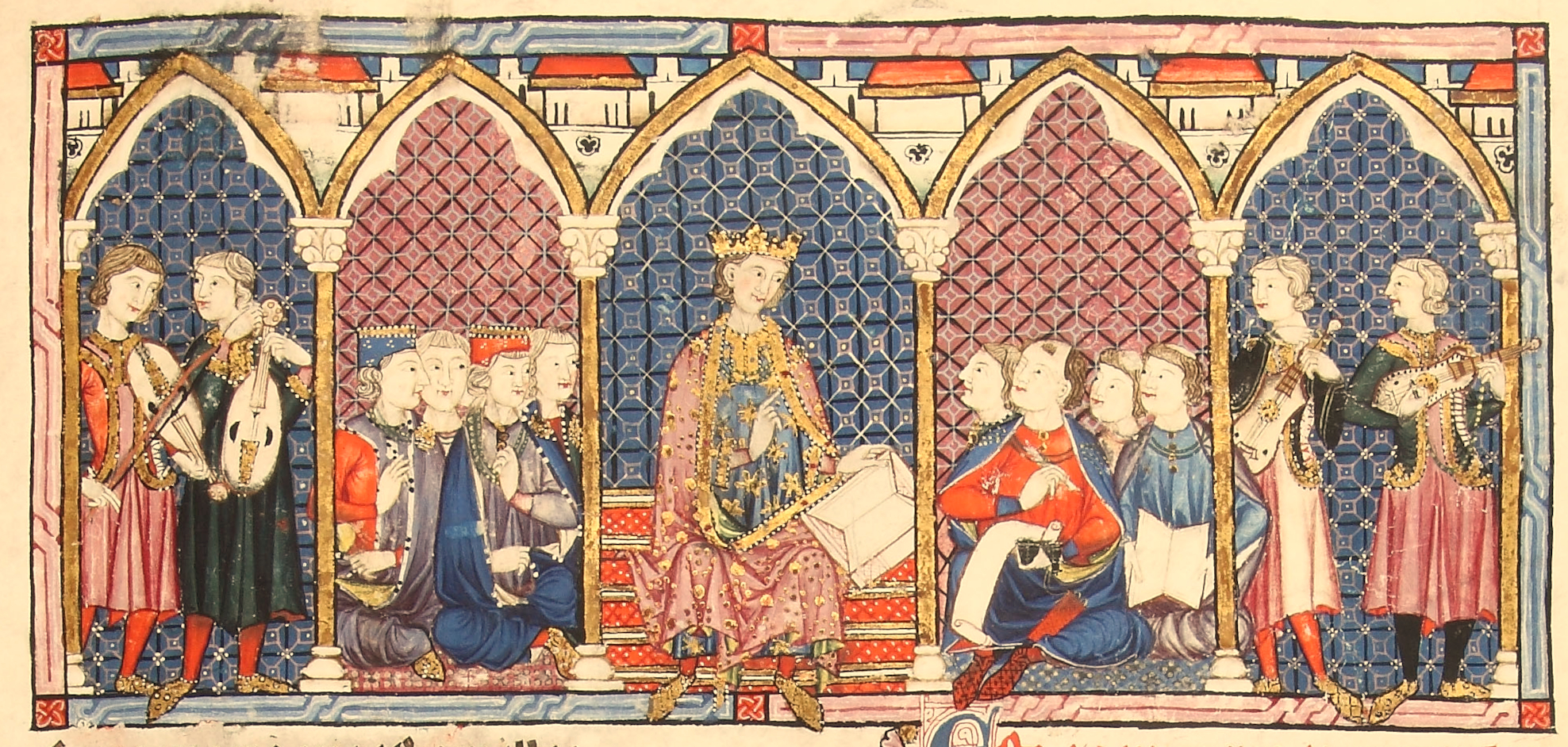
Cantigas de Santa Maria (Castile, 1283).

The Cantigas de Santa Maria and the Libro de los juegos, recorded and illuminated for Alfonso X, are among the most important works of 13th-century book illustration in the Iberian Peninsula.

=== Scandinavia ===
Book illustration had a minor role in Scandinavian art and was of modest quality. The limited number of wealthy monasteries, schools, and literate individuals contributed significantly to the marginalization of book art. Stylistically, it was influenced by Anglo-Saxon and German art, but retained the formal elements of earlier periods for a longer time. For instance, book illustration in the 13th century was mainly restricted to archaic, historicizing initials in the Romanesque style. Gothic forms were not established until around 1300, under English influence. Simultaneously, numerous book illustrations in Northern Europe during the Middle Ages display a provincial vernacular style. Law books hold a prominent position among the illustrated Scandinavian codices.

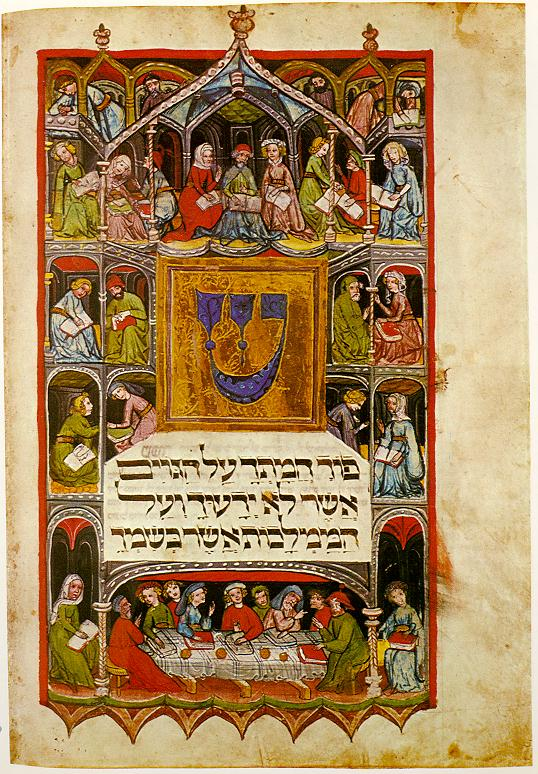
Haggadah illustration, Psalm 79, verse 6 (Germany, 14th century).

=== Jewish book illustration from the Gothic period ===
A unique form of Gothic painting is the Jewish book illustration of Hebrew manuscripts. It was part of the regional artistic landscape and blended into the contemporary style of the respective country. However, it also had common features throughout Europe, which made it stand out from local schools.

In Europe, Jewish book illustration only began to appear with figurative depictions in the 13th century, whereas it was originally limited entirely to ornamentation. The liturgical Jewish Bibles used in the synagogue were generally in the form of scrolls and were always unadorned. The illustrated religious books were intended for private use, primarily the Hebrew Bible with the Torah, the Pentateuch, the Prophets, and the Ketuvim. Other Jewish texts that were frequently illustrated were the Haggadah, the marriage contract Ketubba and the writings of Maimonides and Rashi.

The art of Sephardim in Spain and the Jews in Provence during the 14th century was heavily influenced by oriental decorative systems. Full-page illustrations and depictions of the cult objects of the tabernacle in gold were common. The combination of European Gothic and Muslim ornamentation is typical of the few surviving Jewish Bibles from the Iberian Peninsula. The Catalan Farhi Bible (1366–1382) by Elisha ben Abraham Crescas is a notable example of this period. This cultural flourishing came to an abrupt end with the expulsion of the Jews from France and Spain in 1394 and 1492, respectively, and lastly from Portugal.

== Bibliography ==
- K. Bierbrauer, Ø. Hjort, O. Mazal, D. Thoss, G. Dogaer, J. Backhouse, G. Dalli Regoli, H. Künzl: Buchmalerei. In: Lexikon des Mittelalters (LexMA). Band 2. Artemis & Winkler, München/Zürich 1983, ISBN 978-3-7608-8902-3, Sp. 837–893.
- Ernst Günther Grimme: Die Geschichte der abendländischen Buchmalerei. 3. Auflage. Köln, DuMont 1988. ISBN 978-3-7701-1076-6.
- Christine Jakobi-Mirwald: Das mittelalterliche Buch. Funktion und Ausstattung. Stuttgart, Reclam 2004. ISBN 978-3-15-018315-1, (Reclams Universal-Bibliothek 18315), (Besonders Kapitel: Gotische Buchmalerei S. 263–272).
- Ehrenfried Kluckert: Malerei der Gotik. Tafel-, Wand- und Buchmalerei. In: Rolf Toman (Hrsg.) – Gotik. Architektur, Skulptur, Malerei. Sonderausgabe. Ullmann & Könemann 2007, ISBN 978-3-8331-3511-8, S. 386–467, (Buchmalerei S. 460–467).
- Otto Mazal: Buchkunst der Gotik. Akademische Druck- u. Verlagsanstalt, Graz 1975, ISBN 978-3-201-00949-2, (Buchkunst im Wandel der Zeiten. 1).
- Bernd Nicolai: Gotik. Reclam, Stuttgart 2007, ISBN 978-3-15-018171-3, (Kunst-Epochen. 4) (Reclams Universal-Bibliothek. 18171).
- Otto Pächt: Buchmalerei des Mittelalters. Eine Einführung. Hrsg. von Dagmar Thoss. 5. Auflage. Prestel, München 2004. ISBN 978-3-7913-2455-5.
- Ingo F. Walther / Norbert Wolf: Codices illustres. Die schönsten illuminierten Handschriften der Welt. Meisterwerke der Buchmalerei. 400 bis 1600. Taschen, Köln u. a. 2005, ISBN 978-3-8228-4747-3.
- Margit Krenn, Christoph Winterer: Mit Pinsel und Federkiel, Geschichte der mittelalterlichen Buchmalerei, WBG, Darmstadt, 2009, ISBN 978-3-89678-648-7

== Useful links ==
- Petrarchs Codex Ambrosianus
- Farhi Bible
- University of Toronto Library Virtual Collection
