= Pseudo-Jacquemart =

French illuminator

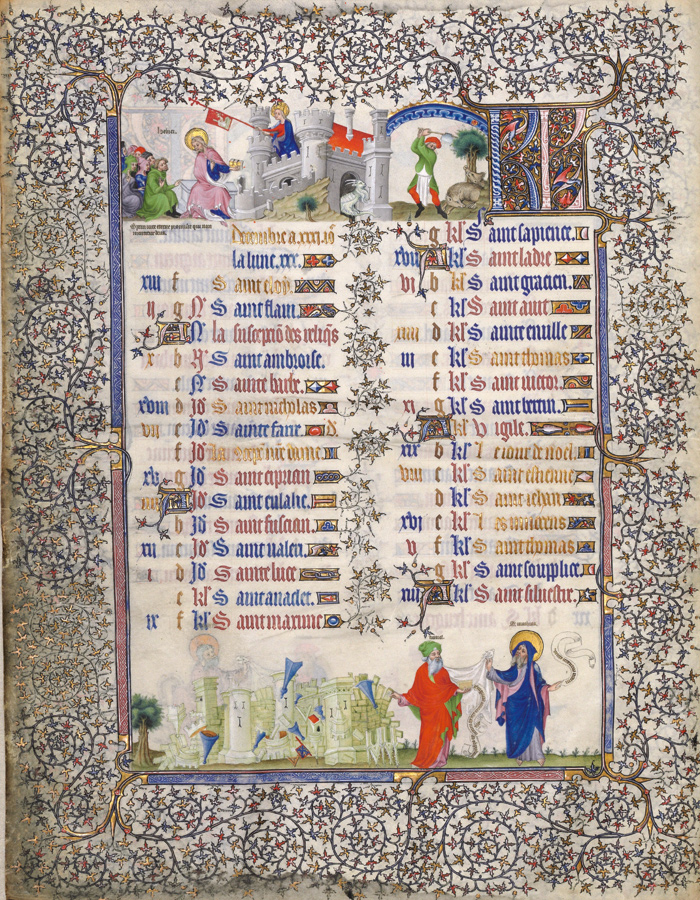
December on the calendar in Les Grandes Heures du duc de Berry, f.6v, to which the artist may have contributed

The Pseudo-Jacquemart (or Pseudo-Jacquemart de Hesdin) was an anonymous master illuminator active in Paris and Bourges between 1380 and 1415. He owed his name to his close collaboration with painter Jacquemart de Hesdin.

== Biographical and stylistic elements ==
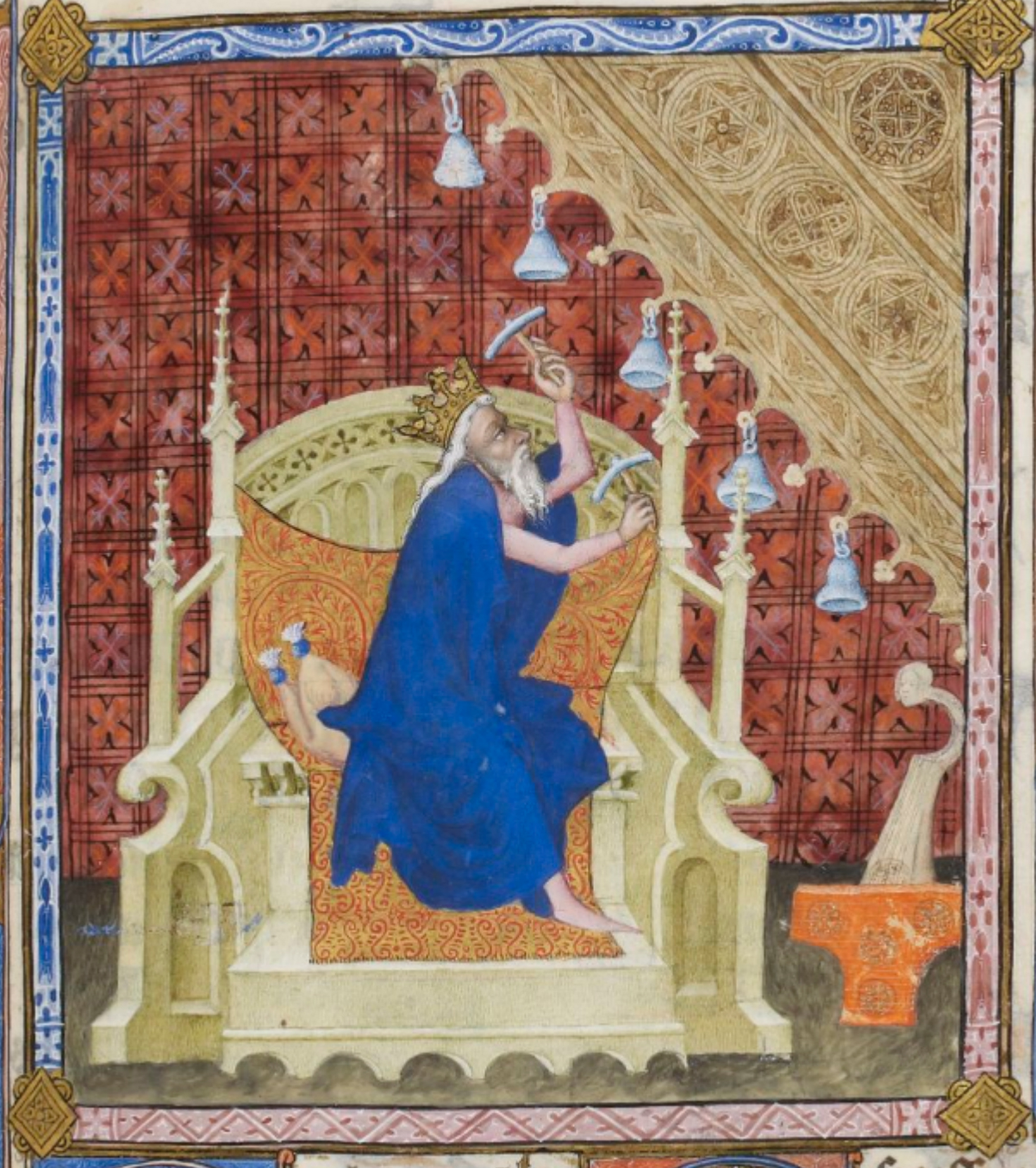
Miniature from the Psalter of John of Berry depicting King David playing music, f.153r

The artist designated as Pseudo-Jacquemart was perhaps of Flemish origin and was active in France from the end of the 14th century to the beginning of the 15th century. Art historian Millard Meiss was the first to distinguish this artist from his contemporary colleague Jacquemart de Hesdin. Pseudo-Jacquemart seems to have been in the employ of John, Duke of Berry, working in the shadow of other illuminators retained by the duke: Jean Pucelle, the Limbourg brothers, and Jacquemart, at the end of his career, from whom he borrowed his style. Pseudo-Jacquemart generally painted the decorations appended to miniatures: marginal scenes, small miniatures of calendars or initials for text. He also worked for other anonymous patrons on books of hours miniatures, in collaboration with other Parisian painters.

Pseudo-Jacquemart is sometimes identified with Jacquemart de Hesdin. The two painters are mentioned as working at the Palace of Poitiers at the request of John, Duke of Berry. In January 1398, a painter, named Jean de Holland, accused them of stealing pigments and models from his box. De Holland was finally killed and the two painters took refuge in the Abbey of Montierneuf at Poitiers where they were afforded asylum. The Duke of Berry eventually obtained a letter of remission for them in May 1398.

Pseudo-Jacquemart's style tended to imitate that of the painters his work supplemented, but an individualized style with a more theatrical sense of composition than seen in Jacquemart de Hesdin's work, with a more assured stroke and a brighter palette is evident.

== Attributed work ==
Pseudo-Jacquemart collaborated with Jacquemart de Hesdin and others on the Duke of Berry's Petit Heures; the Psalter of John of Berry, and Les Grandes Heures du duc de Berry, for which, according to art historian Timothy Husband he may have produced as many as 17 miniatures, but the only surviving leaf is the "Carrying of the Cross". Jean Le Noir painted the calendar leafs for the Duke's Petit Heures, which Pseudo-Jacquemart may have completed.

Pseudo-Jacquemart contributed work to a Book of hours for the use of Rome for an unknown lady, in the form of ornamentation in collaboration with the Mazarine Master and the Luçon Master, and some of the miniatures in the Bible Historial of Guiart des Moulins, (ff. 1, 3v-5v, 7–8, 10–16), attributed to a follower of Jacquemart de Hesdin, are sometimes identified with the Pseudo-Jacquemart. He completed an Annunciation for the Book of hours for the use of Bourges, c. 1405–10, held at the British Library, and two miniatures for the Psalter for use in Evereux, c. 1390–1405: a jester (f.44r) and Office of the Dead (f.131r). The Getty Center, Los Angeles, holds a Book of hours with two images attributed to the artist. The artist may have contributed to a Breviary for the use of Saint-Ambroix de Bourges, in collaboration with the workshop of Boucicaut Master, c. 1410, BM Bourges Ms.0016. He also contributed three miniatures for the La Légende dorée (Golden Legend) of Jacobus de Voragine, c. 1382.
