= Jacquemart de Hesdin =

Medieval French painter

- Born: c. 1335
- Died: c. 1414
- Known for: Miniature paintings
- Style: International Gothic

Jacquemart de Hesdin (c. 1355 – c. 1414) was a French miniature painter working in the International Gothic style. In English, he is also called Jacquemart of Hesdin. During his lifetime, his name was spelt in a number of ways, including as Jacquemart de Odin.

== Background ==
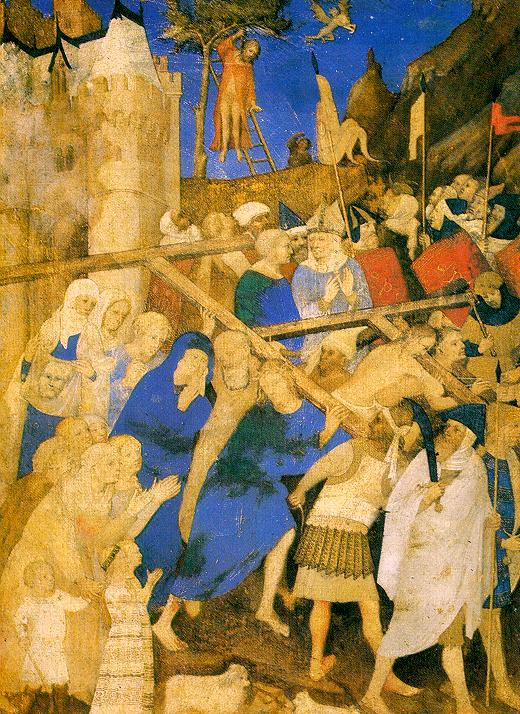
The Carrying of the Cross by Jacquemart, before 1409 (Louvre)

Jacquemart was a painter from Artois. Hesdin, the town from which he took his name, was a fortified citadel in the Pas-de-Calais, then part of Flanders and a stronghold of the Dukes of Burgundy. It is possible that Jacquemart was born there. He was one of the many Netherlandish artists who worked for members of the French royal family from about the middle of the fourteenth century.

Jacquemart's only known patron, John, Duke of Berry (1340–1416), was a younger brother of King Charles V of France. When Charles V died in 1380, his son Charles VI was a minor, so Berry and his brothers Louis I of Anjou, King of Naples (1339–84) and Philip the Bold, Duke of Burgundy (1342–1404), acted as regents of France until 1388. Berry and Burgundy again ruled France from 1392 to 1402, due to the madness of the young Charles VI. Berry spent enormous sums on his art collection, and when he died in 1416 he was deeply in debt. The web site of the Louvre says of Berry: "By his exacting taste, by his tireless search for artists, from Jacquemart de Hesdin to the Limbourg brothers, John of Berry made a decisive contribution to the renewal of art which took place in his time."

Together with Berry's master architect Guy de Dammartin, the Limbourg brothers, and the miniaturist André Beauneveu and his student Jean de Cambrai, Jacquemart was considered to be a friend as well as a protégé of the Duke.

== Career and work ==
Jacquemart's whole career developed at Bourges (the capital of the Province of Berry) at the court of John, Duke of Berry. He was active in the Duke's service from 1384 until 1414 and made a significant contribution to the Duke's famous illuminated books, in particular the Très Belles Heures du Duc de Berry, the Grandes Heures, the Petites Heures, and a Psalter, often working with the Limbourg brothers and the painter known as the Boucicaut Master.

On 28 November 1384, Jacquemart was paid for the first time by the steward of John, Duke of Berry, to cover expenses he and his wife had incurred in Bourges, and he was also paid for his clothes for the coming winter. After 1384, he was paid a regular salary.

In 1398, while Jacquemart was working for Berry in the castle at Poitiers, he was accused with his assistant Godefroy and with his brother-in-law Jean Petit of the theft of colours and patterns from Jean de Hollande, another painter who worked for Berry. Jacquemart is recorded as staying in Bourges in 1399.

The Très Belles Heures du Duc de Berry (sometimes called the Brussels Hours, from the city where it has long been kept) is chiefly the work of Jacquemart. The book is described in an inventory of Berry's library dated 1402:

Unes très belles heures richement enluminées et ystoriées de la main Jacquemart de Odin.

The Très Belles Heures disappeared for several hundred years, but the scholarly consensus is that the manuscript in the Bibliothèque Royale at Brussels is the one described in the 1402 inventory.

Completion of the Petites Heures, which had been started by Jean Le Noir, was entrusted to Jacquemart and others in 1384. Millard Meiss suggests that at least five painters worked on the book's illuminations, Jacquemart and four unidentified artists. One of these four is commonly referred to as the Pseudo-Jacquemart.

Jacquemart's small painting The Carrying of the Cross (vellum mounted on canvas, 38 cm by 28 cm, dated before 1409) is in the Musée du Louvre.

== Art ==
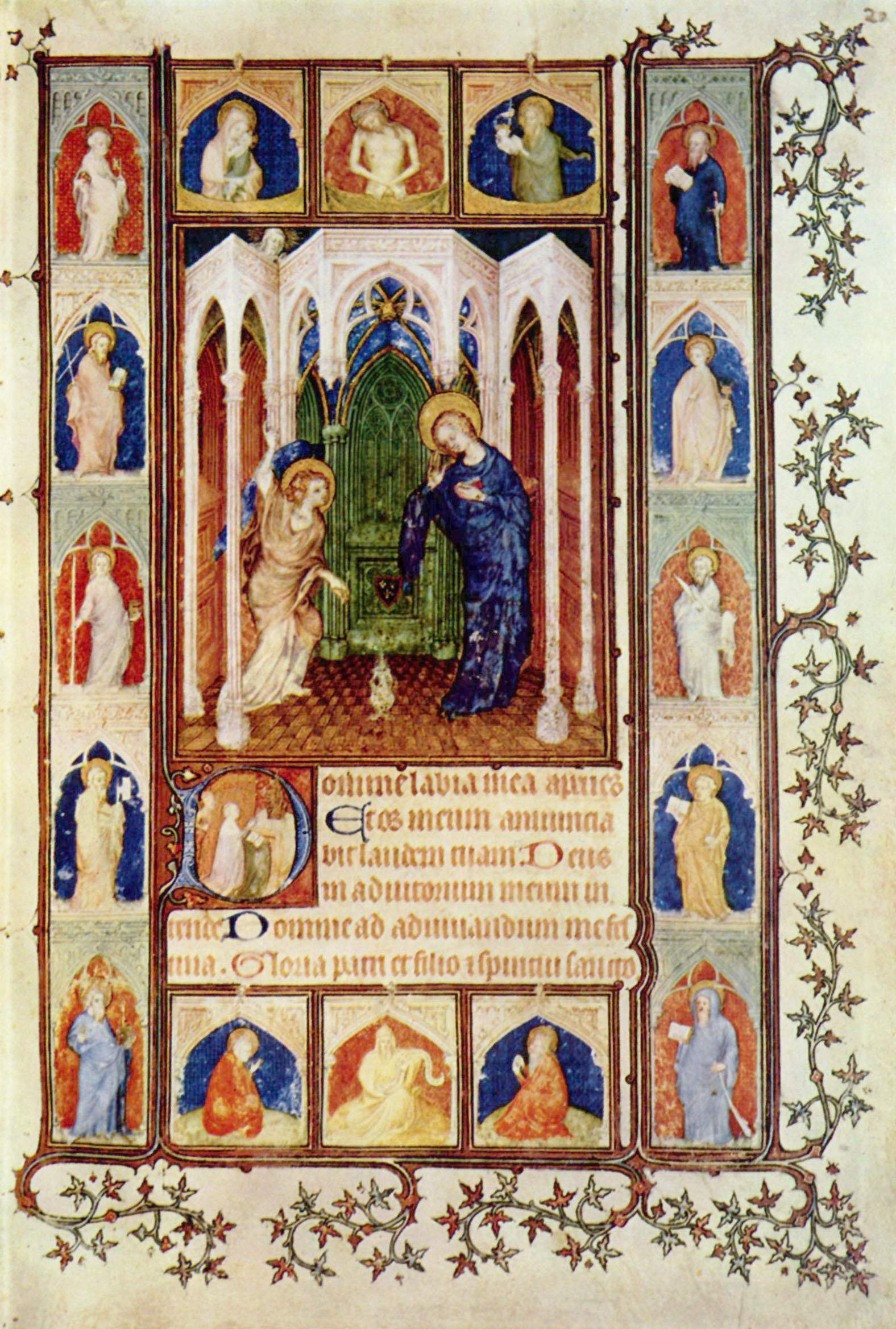
The Annunciation, miniature by Jacquemart de Hesdin from Les Petites Heures of John, Duke of Berry, c. 1400

According to Anne Granboulan, Jacquemart "...manifests a certain mastery in the representation of space, thus showing that he had suitably assimilated the lesson of Siena". She says also that he "...attests the new northern naturalist tendencies, in contrast to the idealized art of Jean Pucelle".

The Columbia Encyclopedia (sixth edition) notes that Jacquemart was influenced by Sienese painting, and his work "...included elaborate architectural interiors used to place figures in a believable space". By studying the work of Pucelle and the Italian painters, Jacquemart developed his modelling and rendering of space and modified the realism which is characteristic of the Netherlandish painters of the period.

He is also noted for his marginalia, shapes of animals and foliage which give his manuscript pages a frame.
