= Petites Heures du Duc de Berry =

Elaborately decorated 14th century prayer book

Les Petites Heures de Jean de Berry
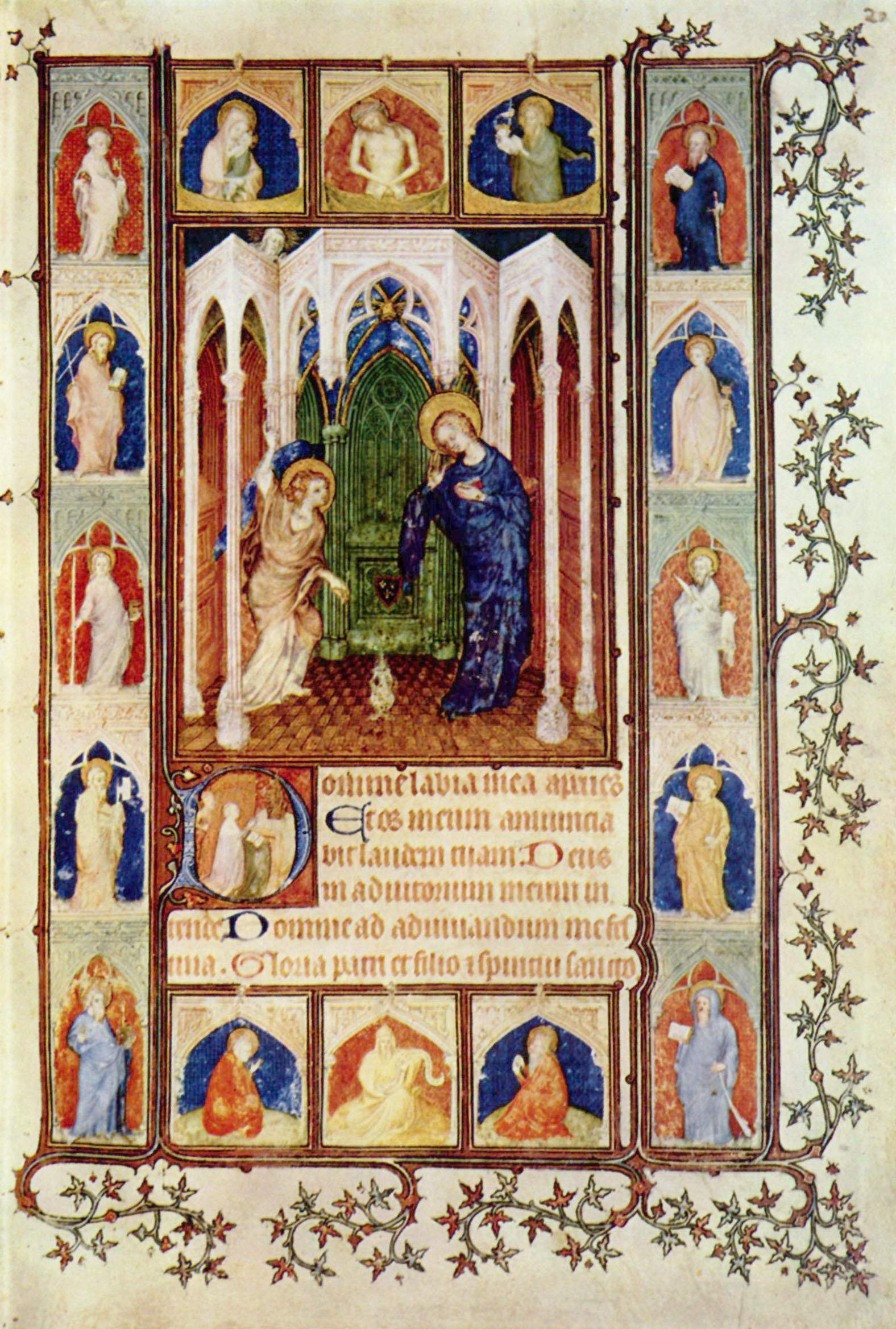
- The Annunciation, miniature by Jacquemart de Hesdin and Jean Le Noir
- Artist: Jean Le Noir; Jacquemart de Hesdin; Pseudo-Jacquemart; Master of the Trinity; Limbourg brothers
- Year: 1375–1390
- Catalogue: Ms. Lat.18014
- Medium: Illuminated book of hours
- Dimensions: 21.5 cm × 14.5 cm (8.5 in × 5.7 in)
- Location: Bibliothèque nationale de France; Paris, France

The Petites Heures du Duc de Berry is an illuminated book of hours commissioned by John, Duke of Berry between 1375 and 1385–90. It is known for its ornate miniature leaves and border decorations.

Several artists were employed in the production. It was completed in two separate stages, each with a distinctive style. The earlier leaves were painted by artists influenced by Jean Pucelle, the later by artists working in the vanguard of the International Gothic period of Gothic art. Because of this, the Petites Heures exemplifies the "rupture in style" that occurred in French illumination in the final two decades of the fourteenth century.

A high-resolution facsimile was published in 1988, with monographs by Avril, Dunlop and Yapp.

== History ==
Jean de Berry commissioned six books of hours between 1375 and 1416. The first, the Petites Heures, contains 182 miniatures. Work started c. 1375 but was interrupted in 1380 and the book was not completed until 1385–90. It is now housed at the Bibliothèque nationale de France under the reference ms. lat. 18014.

The limner Jean Le Noir, a pupil of Jean Pucelle, started work on the illuminations. By the time of his death in 1380, only nine miniatures had been completed. (Note: Meiss and Avril attribute to Jean Le Noir the miniatures of folios 53, 76r, 79v, 82, 83v, 86v, 89v, 92v and 94v, as well as the figures of the angel Gabriel and the Virgin of the Annunciation (f.22) and those of the beggar and his children in the left margin of the 97v. Le Noir's hand can also be seen in the decorative plantlife and the delicate design of the filigree initials. He probably worked on 40v (Announcement to the Shepherds), 207 (Birth of John the Baptist), 208 (John the Baptist in the Wilderness), 212v (Dance of Salome)) In 1384, the duke engaged Jacquemart de Hesdin; completion of the book was left to him (Note: Jacquemart de Hesdin's hand is seen in folios 8, 38, 40v, 42v, 45v, 203, 212, 214) and an assistant known as the Master of the Trinity, (Note: Named for his contributions to Hours of the Trinity, he executed five of that offices' eight miniatures: ff. 183, 188, 189, 192, 194v. His hand is recognized in the painting of the Coronation of the Virgin, in four paintings of the office of the Holy Ghost, and Lamentations (158, 163). Also in the series of offices of the week (137v, 140v, 141v) and in some paintings depicting prayers (100v, 103v, 196, 198v). Meiss also sees his hand in the great paintings of the office of John the Baptist: f. 203, 209v, 211, 214.) and to another artist known as Pseudo-Jacquemart, who painted in some of the underdrawings left by Jean le Noir, as well as contributing his own compositions. (Note: In addition to the calendar, Pseudo-Jacquemart completed the scenes begun by Jean Le Noir: ff. 8, 9v, 12, 71, 73, 75, 134v, 136, 141, 142v, 144, 144v, 155, 164, 166, 191, 193, 196v, 197v, 198, 206, 217. Scenes of ff. 116v, 139, 143v, 145v, 145v, 162, 167-176v, 181v, 239, 267, 278v, 282r, 286.) Four small miniatures have been attributed to the one whom the American art historian Millard Meiss designates as the "Fifth Master". (Note: Folios 160, 161, 186v, 199v) A single page by the Limbourg brothers, the Duke of Berry Setting off on a Trip, was added to the manuscript around 1412.

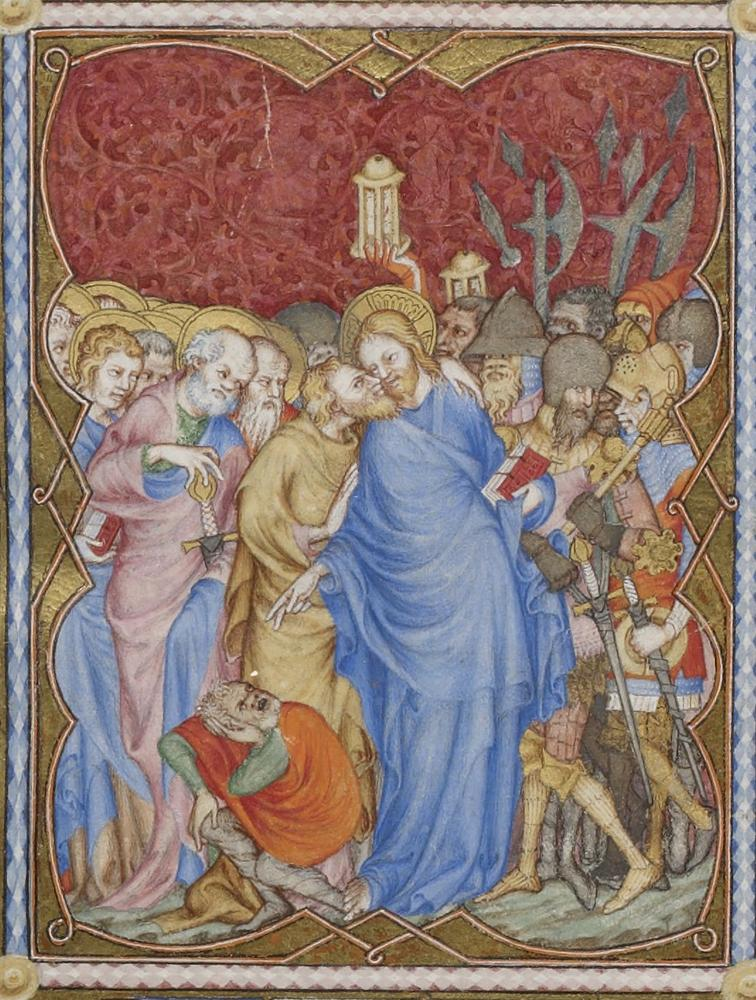
Hours of the Passion. Le Noir's miniature showing Jesus' arrest in the garden at Gethsemane (fol. 76r)

Meiss distinguishes five separate contributors to the work and identifies Le Noir with "the Passion Master", an anonymous illuminator so-called because he illustrated the Passion. His characteristics have been described as "rather cool, dusty colours" and a "delightful, often humorous depiction of animals", also rocky scenery and agitated figures with expression. Jacquemart de Hesdin worked on the Hours of the Virgin. Characteristics are a representation of space influenced by Italian painting and a "more realistic rendering of reality" based on collaboration with Jan Boudolf of Bruges. The styles of Jacquemart de Hesdin and Pseudo-Jacquemart are very similar because they worked together for more than 20 years. The latter has been described as copying the style of others rather than being creative.

The duke commissioned the Petites Heures around the same time as his older brother Charles V acquired the Savoy Hours, "one of the grandest books of the period" executed in about 1335–40. To the Savoy Hours, Charles added a new cover with jeweled clasps, further texts, and copious miniatures by the Master of the Bible of Jean de Sy. Comparison of the two books reveals that Jean de France modeled the content and structure of the Petites Heures on his brother's manuscript, which had "clearly aroused his competitive spirit, and no doubt, envy." (Note: For further analysis of the two books, see: Roger S. Wieck's 2005 essay "Bibliophilic Jealousy and the Manuscript Patronage of Jean, Duc de Berry".)

In the Petites Heures Berry pays homage to his parents, Jean the Good and Bonne of Luxembourg, through instructive prayers and texts copied from their respective books.

== Selected miniatures ==
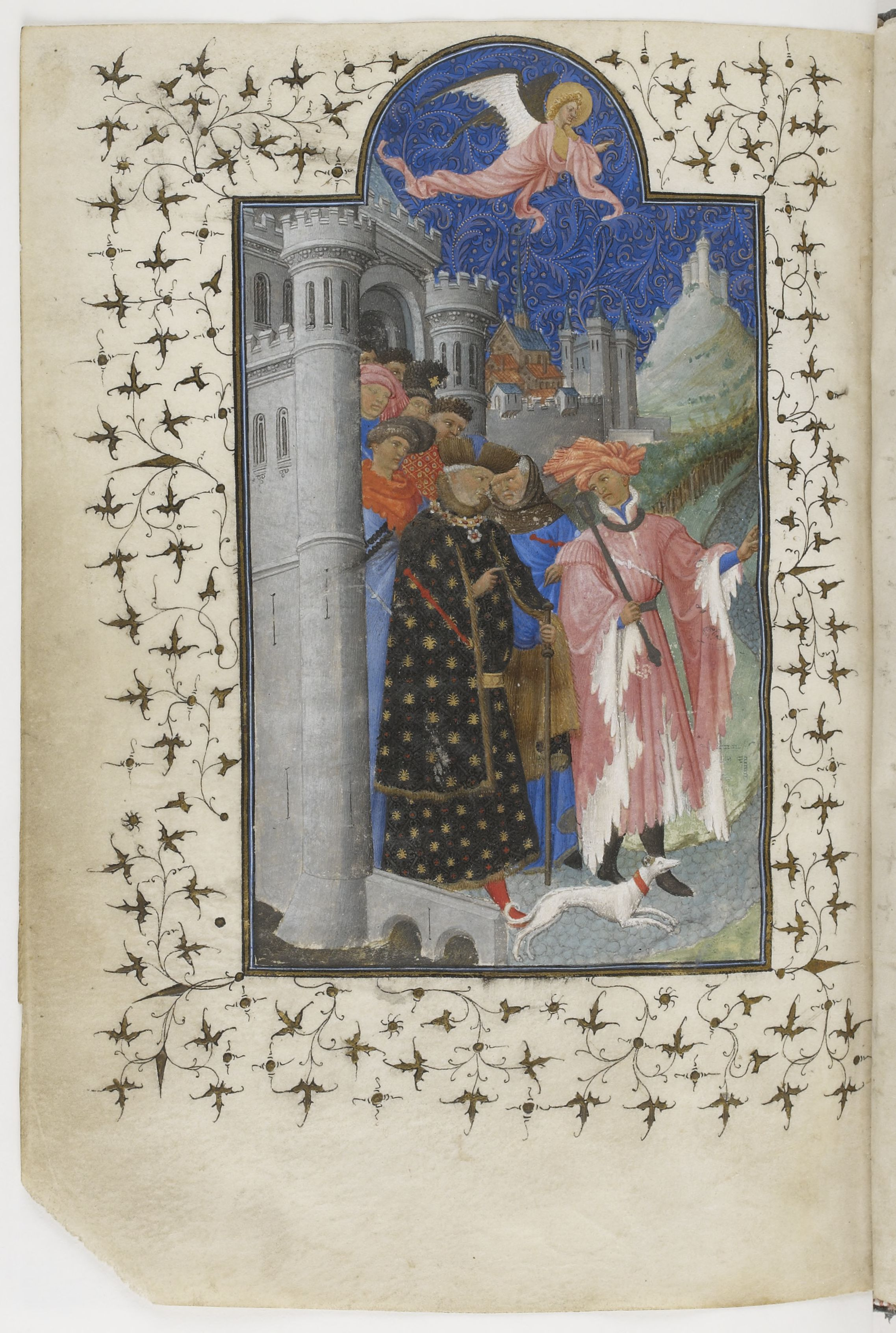
Duke of Berry Setting off on a Trip

Duke of Berry Setting off on a Trip (fol. 288v) is established as by the Limbourg brothers, the third such image commissioned by the duke of a personal itinerary with an angel pointing the way. I was perhaps intended as a talisman; Husband notes that the duke "is clearly an older man, the angel's guidance may not be entirely bound to the earthly realm."

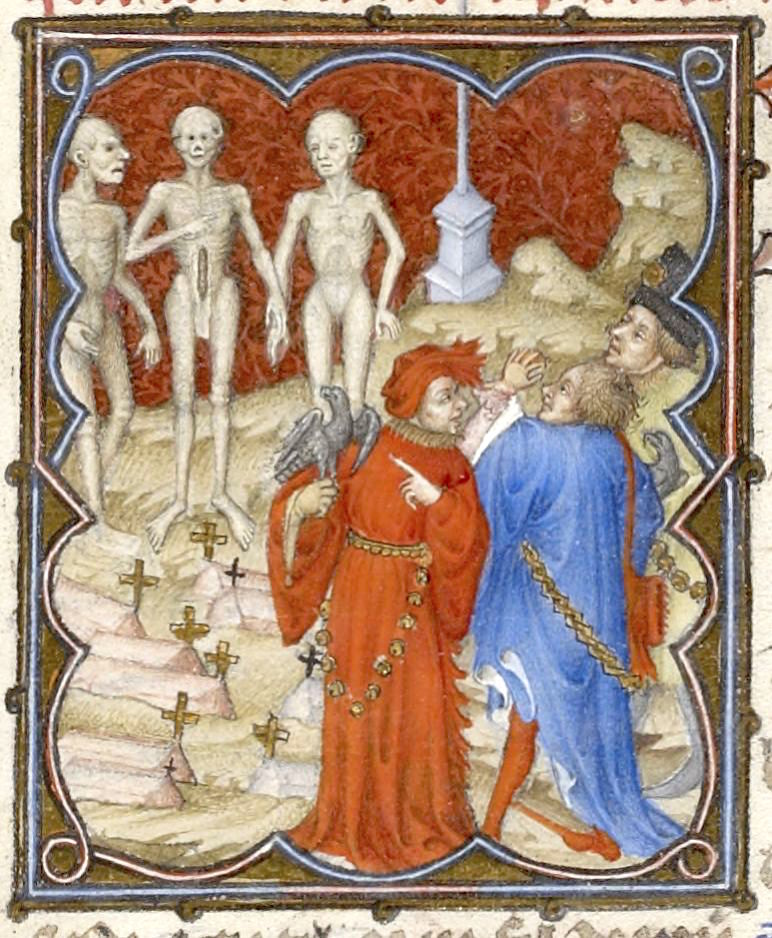
Tale of the Three Dead and the Three Living

The Tale of the Three Dead and the Three Living (fol. 282r) is a relatively common form of memento mori, found in both medieval art and poetry (cf. The Three Dead Kings). Berry, "veritably obsessed with self-display", associates himself with the tale in several of his commissions, the images providing an opportunity to display "ostentatious humility". The text is copied from his mother's psalter. Prefaced as a "moult merueilleuse et horrible histoire" ("mournful and horrible history") it describes an encounter between three young men and three dead men in different stages of decomposition. The first apparition says "What you are, we were, what we are, you will be", the second reminds them that death treats rich and poor equally, the third adds that there is no escape from their fate.

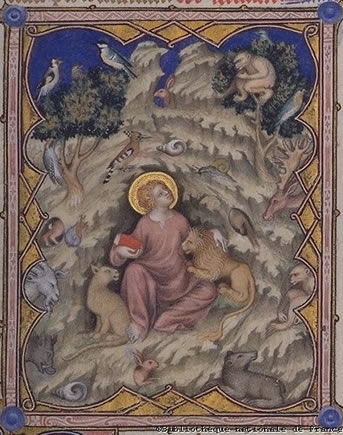
John the Baptist in the Wilderness

John the Baptist in the Wilderness (fol. 208r) is identified by Meiss as an example of the Passion Master's later style, "which displays a new interest in the problems of relating depth" It is an early example of a new trend in depictions of John, where the harsh desert setting was replaced with a fertile landscape, most probably inspired by Fra Domenico Cavalca's Life of St. John the Baptist (1320–42), in which "the desert was described as a place of great natural beauty, full of flowers, trees, and animals."

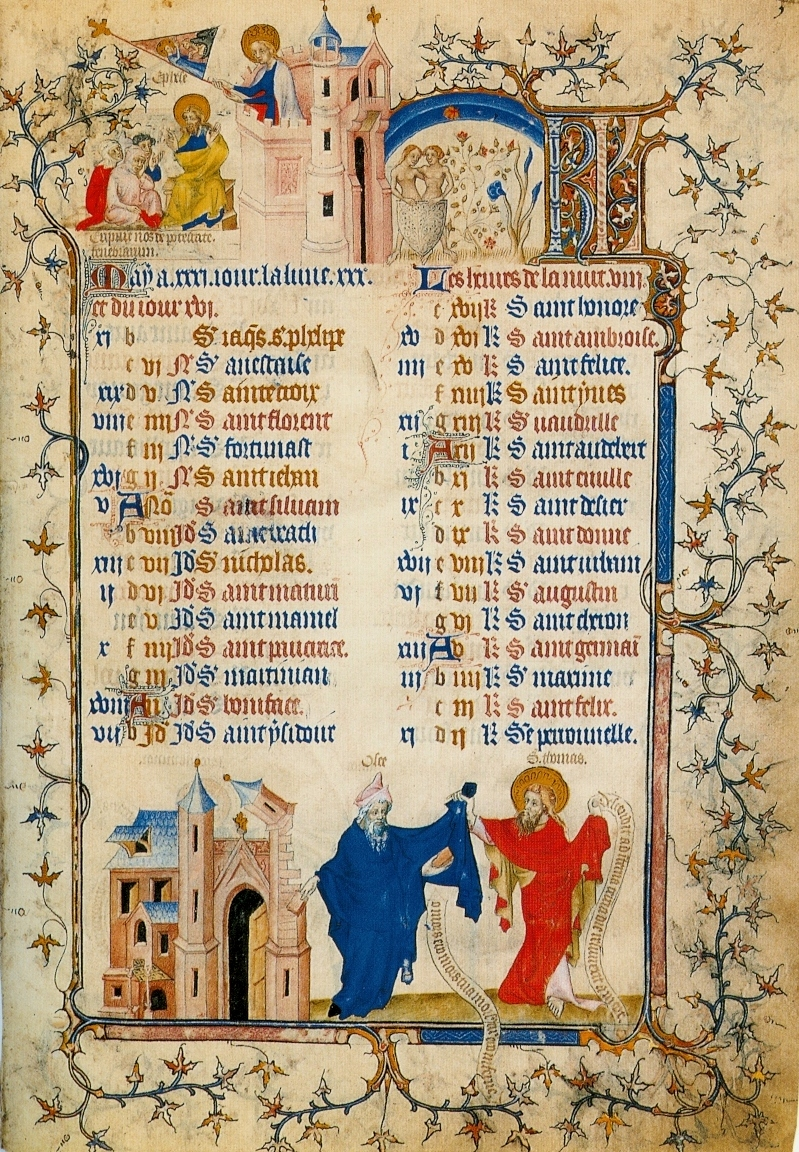
Calendar for May

The Calendar for May by Pseudo-Jacquemart. (fol. 3r) is an example of iconography first used by Jean Pucelle in the Belleville Breviary. Each month of the year shows an apostle, representative of the New Testament, and a prophet of the Old Testament. The prophet submits a veiled prophecy which is explained by the apostle as an article of faith, while simultaneously, the prophet gives the apostle a stone from the synagogue, which as the months progress is reduced to a ruin.

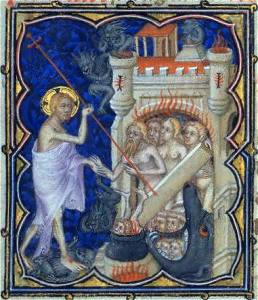
The Harrowing of Hell

The Harrowing of Hell is thought to have been started by Le Noir and completed by Pseudo-Jacquemart (fol. 166). The Harrowing of Hell is derived from the Apostles' Creed and the Athanasian Creed, which state that Jesus descended into Hell before his resurrection in order to save the righteous who had come before his earthly ministry.

== See also ==
- Belles Heures of Jean, Duc de Berry
- Très Riches Heures of Jean, Duc de Berry
- Turin-Milan Hours, owned and perhaps commissioned by Berry

== Sources ==
- Husband, Timothy B. (2008). The Art of Illumination: The Limbourg Brothers and the Belle Heures of Jean de France, Duc de Berry. The Metropolitan Museum of Art, New York. ISBN 978-1-58839-294-7.
- Meiss, Millard. French Painting in the Time of Jean De Berry: The Late Fourteenth Century and the Patronage of the Duke (2 Vols). London: Phaidon. pp. 44, 160–69. ISBN 978-0714813097.
- Hourihane, Colum (2002). The Grove Encyclopedia of Medieval Art and Architecture. Vol. 2. OUP. ISBN 978-0-19539-536-5.
- Latin 18014 archivesetmanuscrits.bnf
- Tzeutschler Lurie, Ann (April 1981). "A Newly Discovered Eyckian St. John the Baptist in a Landscape". The Bulletin of the Cleveland Museum of Art. 68 (4): 87–109. JSTOR 25159721.
- Hulse, Clark (1990). The Rule of Art: Literature and Painting in the Renaissance. University of Chicago Press. p. 33. ISBN 978-0-226-36052-2.
- Kinch, Ashby (2013). Imago Mortis: Mediating Images of Death in Late Medieval Culture. BRILL. ISBN 978-90-04-24581-5.
