= Hours of Jeanne de Navarre =

French illuminated manuscript

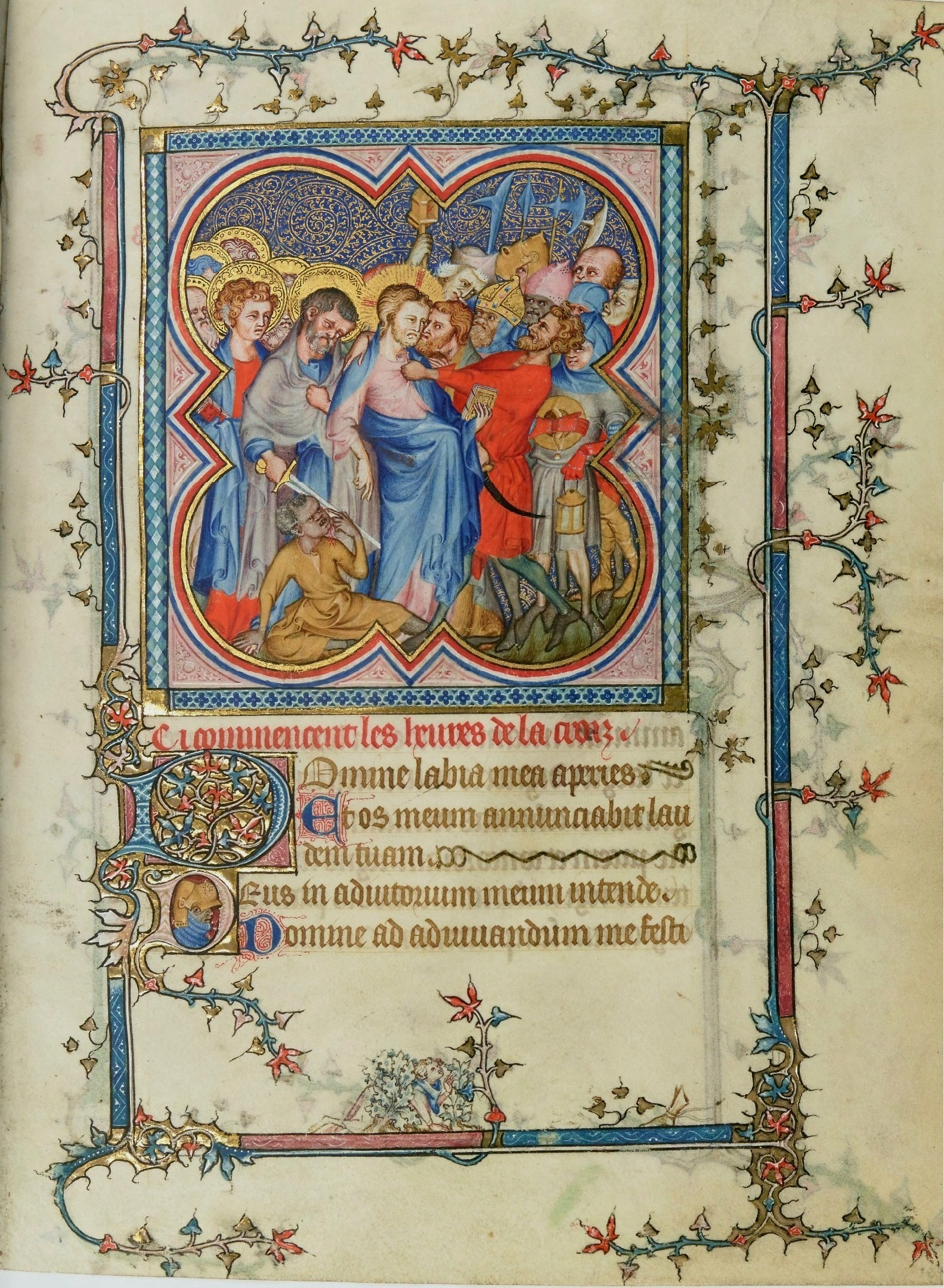
The Betrayal of Christ on the Mount of Olives from the Hours of Jeanne de Navarre
- Folio 85 verso, the introductory picture to the Office of the Passion
- Artist: Jean Le Noir
- Year: 1336-1340
- Medium: Glair and gold on vellum
- Dimensions: 180 x 135 mm
- Location: Bibliotheque Nationale, Paris
- Illustrator: Jean Le Noir
- Publication date: c. 1336
- Media type: Book of hours

The Hours of Jeanne de Navarre is an illuminated book of hours with miniatures painted by Jean Le Noir. The book was commissioned by Philip VI of France and his wife, Blanche of Navarre for her mother, Jeanne de Navarre, Queen of Navarre. The book was created sometime between 1336 and 1340 and is now in the Bibliothèque Nationale, Paris.

== Contents ==
The illuminated book consists of 271 folios written in Latin. There are 32 illustration miniatures.

=== Books of Hours ===
The creation of books of hours during the Middle Ages was a very common process for female members of the royal family. The first king of France, John the Good, was especially interested in illuminated manuscripts. Before the thirteenth century, books of hours were given as gifts to the church. As more and more aristocrats wanted to practice inside their own homes, more of these books were commissioned for private religious devotion. These books are very similar to psalter books. This book can also be seen as a form of connoisseurship, where some books have no evidence of usage of fingerprints or rubbing on the book.

=== Format ===
The Hours of Jeanne de Navarre features border bars and ivy on the larger illuminations of this book, which is a very similar stylistic approach to other illuminated manuscripts. The ivy included colouring of blue, yellow, and red, which is similar to that of the French Psalterium. A psalterium contains religious lyrics and is used in a religious context by priests for prayer or practice. The ivy is also a religious symbol, mostly connected to the idea of immortality.

=== The Betrayal of Christ on the Mount of Olives ===
This image is the introductory picture to the Office of Passion section of the book of hours. This section is highly important as the Passion focused piety and devotion, which was very important during the medieval period.

The composition of the manuscript page is very crowded. All of the figures are overlapping with each other and interacting in some way. Jesus is the man in the middle wearing a red dress robe with a blue shawl covering himself. Peter is shown to the left of Jesus wearing a blue tunic and shawl. Malchus, who was a servant of the Jewish High Priest Caiaphas, is shown towards Peter's feet, getting his ear cut off. Jesus is seen being arrested by a group of Roman soldiers who are on the right side of the page. Jesus had been betrayed earlier in the day by one of his Apostles, Judas Iscariot. Judas got thirty pieces of silver for his betrayal and led the soldiers to the garden where Jesus and the disciples were on Mount Olive. The figures on the left include Jesus and his disciples, all have golden halos around their heads, which is a sign of divinity. Jesus specifically has golden rays on his halo.

In the Gospel of Mark, it has been said that a young man ran away when Jesus was captured; academics have assumed that this is the boy hiding in the bush at the bas-de-page. The Gospel mentions his nakedness, which is not depicted here, however, this interpretation could be that he is looking for his shoes in the bush when he originally fled, as he is no longer wearing shoes.

== Patronage ==
Jeanne de Navarre is also referred to as Joan II of Navarre. Jeanne de Navarre was the daughter of the French King Louis X and Margaret of Burgundy. Philip VI, who gifted her the book, was Jeanne's second cousin on her father's side and the King of France beginning in 1328. He came to terms with Jeanne and her husband, Philip III, in which they renounced their claim to Champagne and Brie in exchange for the right of Navarre. Together they ruled from 1328 to their respective deaths in 1348 and 1349.

== Artistic influences ==
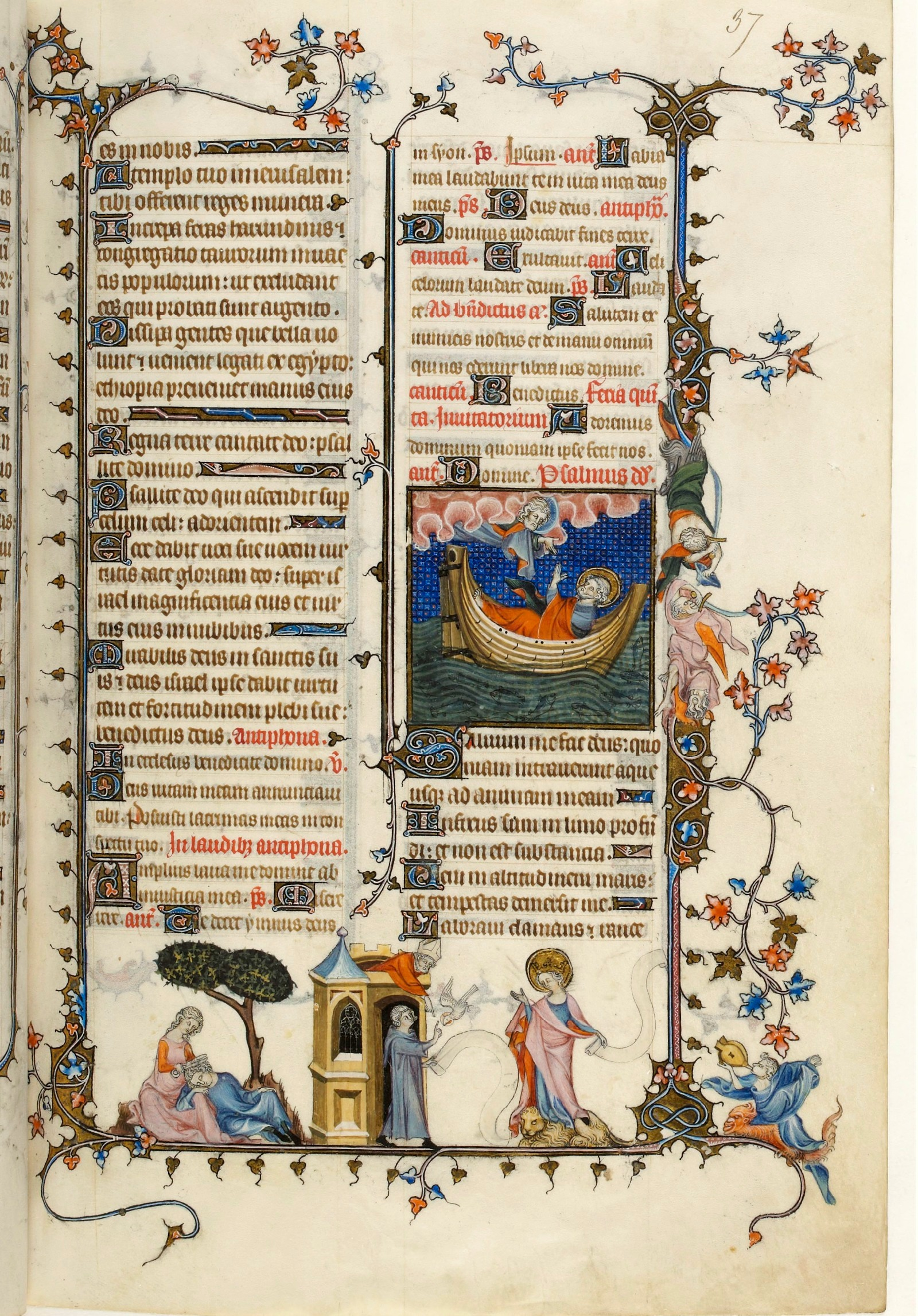
Psalm 70 from the Belleville Breviary

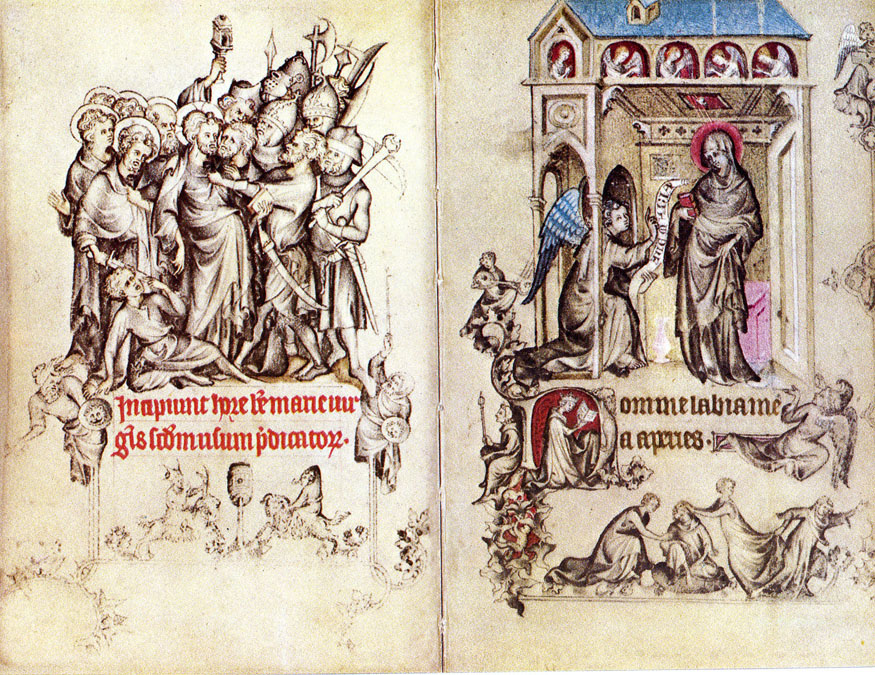
The Betrayal of Christ on the Mount on Olives from the Hours of Jeanne d'Eureux

A soldier appears in the small initial D, looking at the observer through his half-opened visor. This is a motif that was invented by Pucelle.

The Hours of Jeanne de Navarre was modeled on the first volume of the Belleville Breviary. They have similar coloring, lettering, and the foliage outline of the words. Jeanne de Navarre's book also contains miniatures depicting the four offices devoted to the Trinity, the Virgin Mary, Saint Louis, and the Passion that is also in the Belleville Breviary. This combination is rare in books of Hours.

The composition The Betrayal of Christ on the Mount Olives from the Hours of Jeanne de Navarre is based on a miniature from the Hours de Jeanne d'Evreux created by Jean Pucelle which is folio 15 verso ill. A trait that Le Noir picks up from Pucelle is the tiny soldier peeking out of the D initial on the page.

== Artist ==
Jean Le Noir was an active illuminator in Paris between 1335 and 1380. He was a student of Jean Pucelle: scholars even assumed Le Noir took over Pucelle's workshop when he passed. Le Noir and his daughter, Bourgot Le Noir, worked for Yolande of Flanders and later the King. In 1364, he worked for Charles V and soon after they worked in Bourges for the Duke of Berry during the 1370s. His title during the time this manuscript was created was Jehan Lenior, enluminieur.

Earlier research on this book attributed Jean Pucelle as the creator due to the coloring and the shape of the figures. However, in 1970, it was discovered that Pucelle had died in 1334 before the book was created. The references to Navarre, Evreux, and Burgandy, but not Champagne, point to the book being created after 1336 when Jeanne had given up that title. Research also indicates that four miniaturists were involved in this book process. The first artist would have come from a collective groups of artist studying together and would become the main master of the book. This would have been the role of Jean Le Noir. He would have been in charge of the most pictures in the codex such as the Office of the Blessed Virgin and the Office of Passion.

== Provenance ==
During the fifteenth century, the manuscript was in the possession of Anne Belline, who was a nun at the Convent of Cordelieres de Lurcines. The book remained with the nunnery up through the seventeenth century. The manuscript then came into the possession of Bertram Ashburnham, 4th Earl of Ashburnham and then Henry Yates Thompson. It was then brought into the art collection of Baron Edmond and Alexandrine de Rothschild. It was previously believed the book was given to Bibliothèque Nationale, Paris. in the 19th century, but as explained in Christopher de Hamel's Meetings With Remarkable Manuscripts it was actually purchased by the French government from the West German government in the 1960s having been in the possession of Hermann Göring during the Second World War.

== Gallery ==
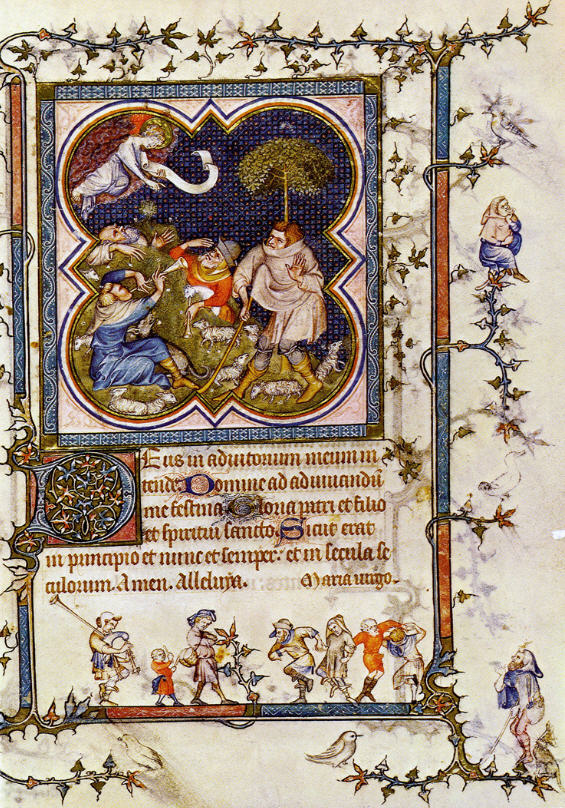
The Annunciation of the Shepherd

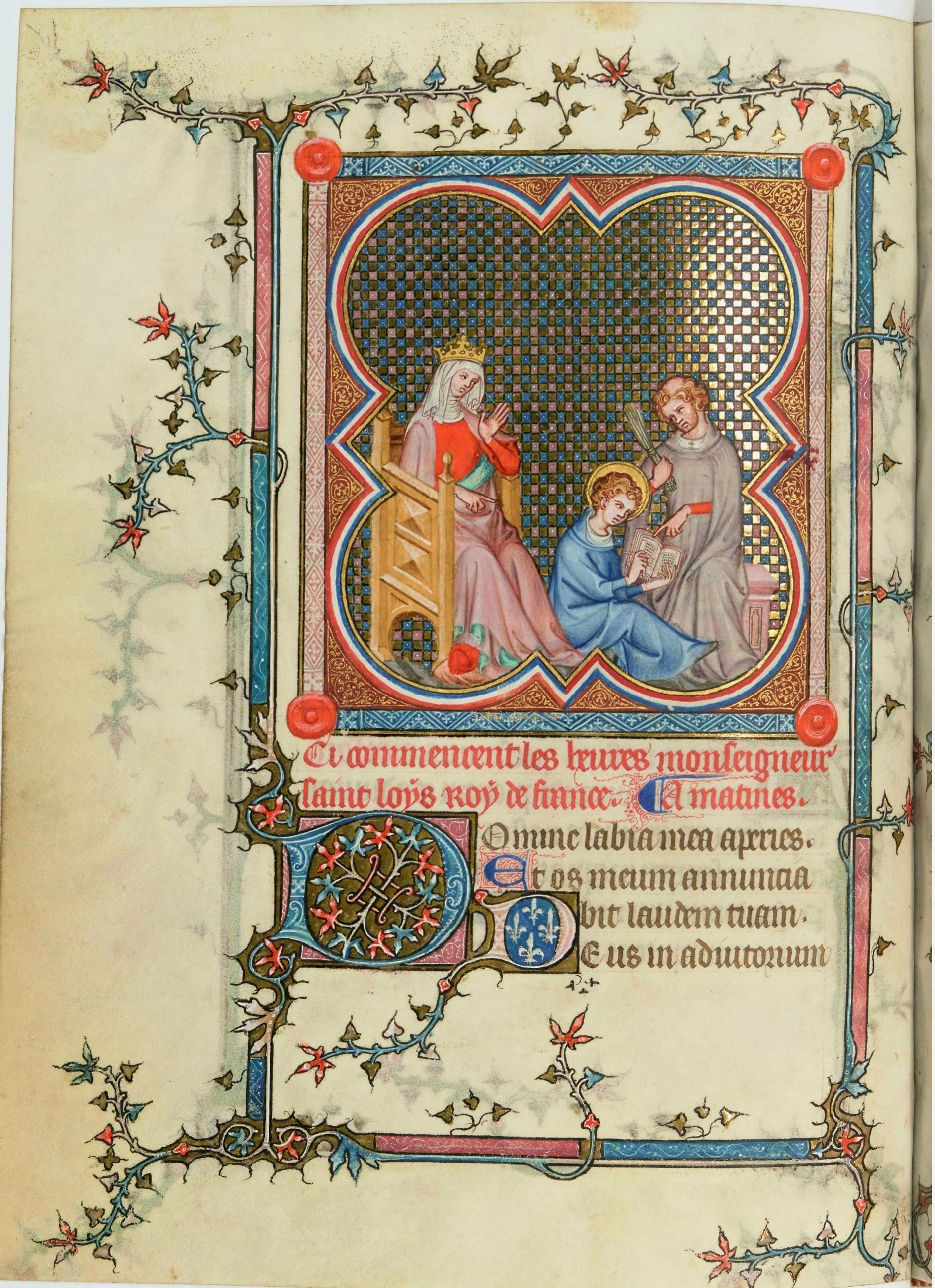
Education of Saint Louis

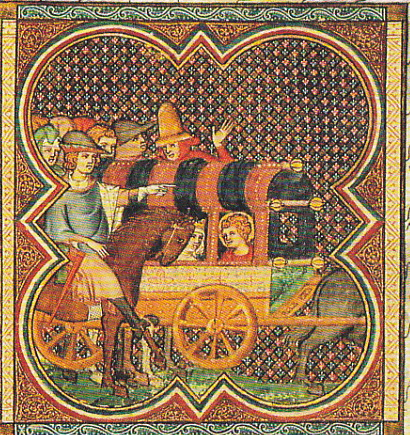
St Louis and Blanche of Castille Riding to Reins for the Coronation
