= The Three Dead Kings =

15th-century Middle English poem

The Three Dead Kings (Latin: De tribus regibus mortuis) is a 15th-century Middle English poem. It is found in the manuscript MS. Douce 302 in the Bodleian Library in Oxford, and its authorship is sometimes attributed to a Shropshire priest, John Audelay. It is an extremely rare survival from a late genre of alliterative verse, also significant as the only English poetic retelling of a well-known memento mori current in medieval European church art.

== Synopsis ==
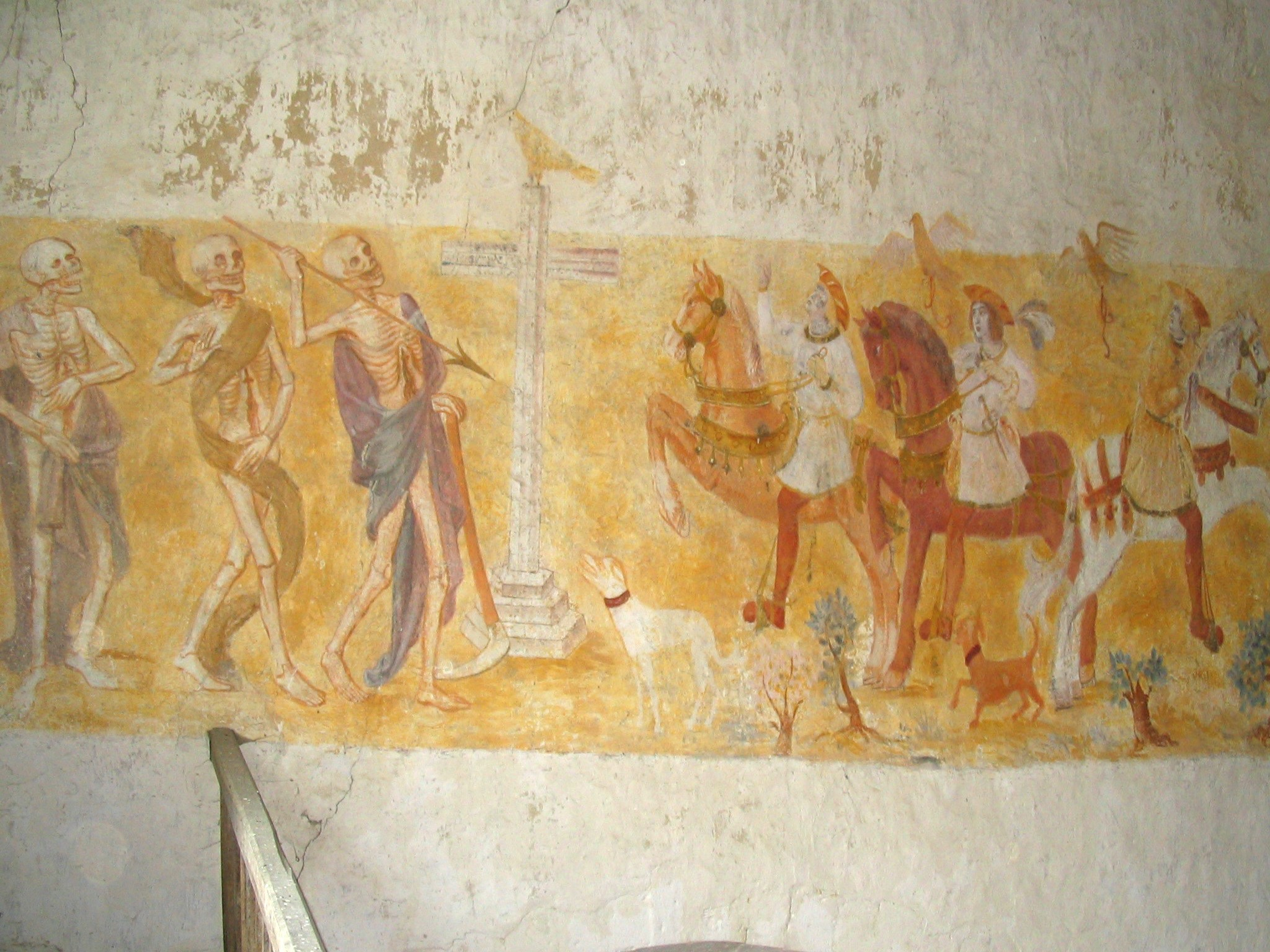
A French church wall painting depicting the Three Living and the Three Dead, from the Église Saint-Germain in La Ferté-Loupière, Yonne

The theme of "The Three Living and the Three Dead" is a relatively common form of memento mori in mediaeval art. The earliest manuscript evidence for the story comes from late 13th-century France. A Dit des trois morts et des trois vifs by Baudoin de Condé has been traced back to 1280.

In the poem, an unnamed narrator describes seeing a boar hunt, a typical opening of the genre of the chanson d'aventure. Three kings are following the hunt; they lose their way in mist and are separated from their retainers. Suddenly, "schokyn out of a schawe" ("starting out of a wood") three walking corpses appear, described in graphically hideous terms. The kings are terrified, but show a range of reactions to the three Dead, ranging from a desire to flee to a resolve to face them. The three corpses, in response, state that they are not demons, but the three kings' forefathers, and criticise their heirs for neglecting their memory and not saying masses for their souls: "Bot we haue made ȝoue mastyrs amys/ Þat now nyl not mynn us with a mas" ("But we have made you masters amiss/ Who now will not commemorate us with a mass"). Once, the three Dead were materialistic and pleasure-loving, saying "Wyle I was mon apon mold merþis þai were myne" ("While I was a man upon Earth, pleasures were mine"), and they now suffer for it. Eventually, the Dead leave, the red daylight comes, and the kings ride home. The final message of the Dead is that the living should always be mindful of them, saying "Makis your merour be me" ("Make your mirror be me"), and of the transient nature of life. Afterwards the kings raise a church "with masse" and have the story written on its walls.

Apart from its complex structure, the poem is distinguished for its vividly descriptive and imaginative language.

== Poetic form ==
Along with other poems in MS. Douce 302, The Three Dead Kings is written in a dialect of Middle English local to the area of Shropshire and west Staffordshire.

The poem has an extremely unusual structure, combining a four-stress alliterative line, a tight rhyme scheme, and regular use of assonance. The structure of the rhymes, ABABABAB in the first eight lines of each stanza and CDCCD in the final five, combines with the alliteration, and the use of the same final consonant on the fourth stress throughout the entire stanza, to produce an additional pararhyme between pairs of lines, as in lines 79-91:

Þen speke þe henmest kyng, in þe hillis he beholdis,
He lokis vnder his hondis and his hed heldis;
Bot soche a carful k[ny]l to his hert coldis,
So doþ þe knyf ore þe kye, þat þe knoc kelddus.
Hit bene warlaws þre þat walkyn on þis woldis.
Oure Lord wyss us þe rede-way þat al þe word weldus!
My hert fare[s] fore freȝt as flagge when hit foldus,
Vche fyngyr of my hond fore ferdchip hit feldus.
Fers am I ferd of oure fare;
Fle we ful fast þer-fore.
Can Y no cownsel bot care.
Þese dewyls wil do vs to dare,
Fore drede lest þai duttyn vche a dore.

Translation:

Then speaks the last king, he looks in the hills
He looks under his hands and holds his head;
But a dreadful blow goes cold to his heart
Like the knife or the key, that chills the knuckle.
These are three demons that walk on these hills
May our Lord, who rules all the world, show us the quickest way out!
My heart bends with fright like a reed,
Each finger of my hand grows weak with fear.
I'm forcefully afraid of our fate;
Let us quickly flee, therefore.
I can give no counsel but worry.
These devils will make us cower
For dread lest they shut each escape.

A few other Middle English poems use a similar thirteen-line stanza, but The Three Dead Kings has the most elaborate structure: medievalist Thorlac Turville-Petre refers to it as "the most highly patterned and technically complex poem in the language".

== Authorship ==
MS. Douce 302, now held at the Bodleian Library, is a manuscript of work by John Audelay, a chantry priest at Haughmond Abbey, Shropshire, who is known to have been alive in 1426, when the manuscript may have been compiled. By this point he stated that he was old, deaf, and blind, although this complicates the question of how he could have authored the poetry in the manuscript. Some scholars have argued that Audelay's other poetry lacks the great technical skill shown in The Three Dead Kings, and that he is therefore unlikely to have written it, especially as it shows signs of a more northerly dialect. Others, however, have defended his authorship, noting that he favours both alliteration and thirteen-line stanza forms elsewhere in the manuscript.
