= Psalter of Bonne de Luxembourg =

14th-century illuminated manuscript

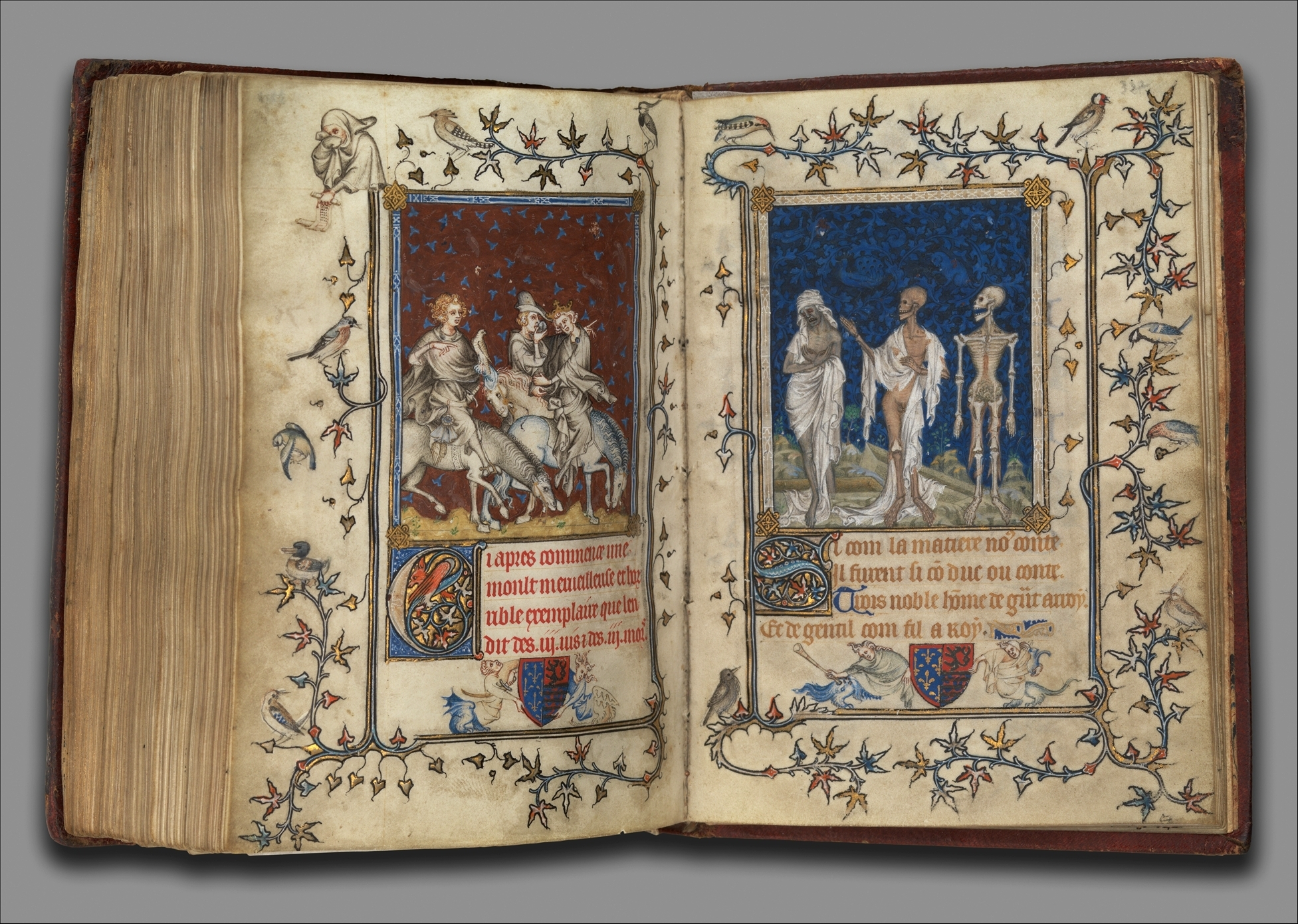
The Fool Hath said in his heart, There is no God; illustration of Psalm 53. Miniature from Psalter of Bonne de Luxembourg, Jean le Noir, c. 1348–49, New York, The Cloisters, Inv. 69. 86. (12.5 x 8.4 x 3.9 cm)

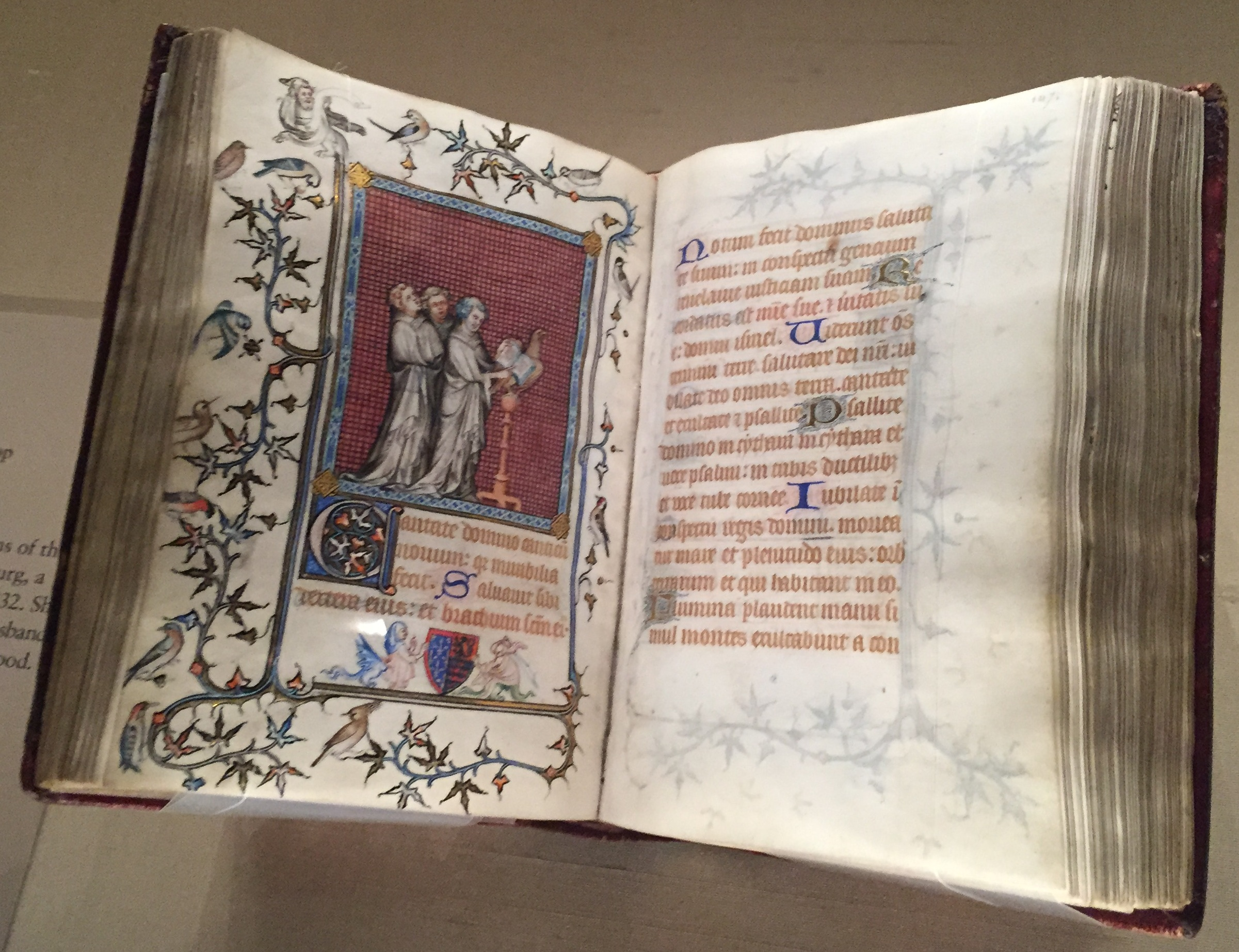

The Psalter of Bonne de Luxembourg is a small 14th-century illuminated manuscript in tempera, grisaille, ink and gold leaf on vellum. It was probably commissioned for Bonne de Luxembourg, Duchess of Normandy, daughter of John the Blind and the wife of John II of France, probably at the end of her husband's life, c 1348–49. At the time, illuminated manuscripts could compete with monastic scriptoria and panel painting as commercially attractive donor portraits. Bonne died of plague in 1349.

It consists of 333 pages of parchment each measuring 126 x 88 mm. The illustrations are attributed to the miniaturist Jean Le Noir, and include graphic representations of astrological predictions by the Roman writer Marcus Manilius. It is held in the collection of The Cloisters, New York, where it is usually on display.

== Commission ==
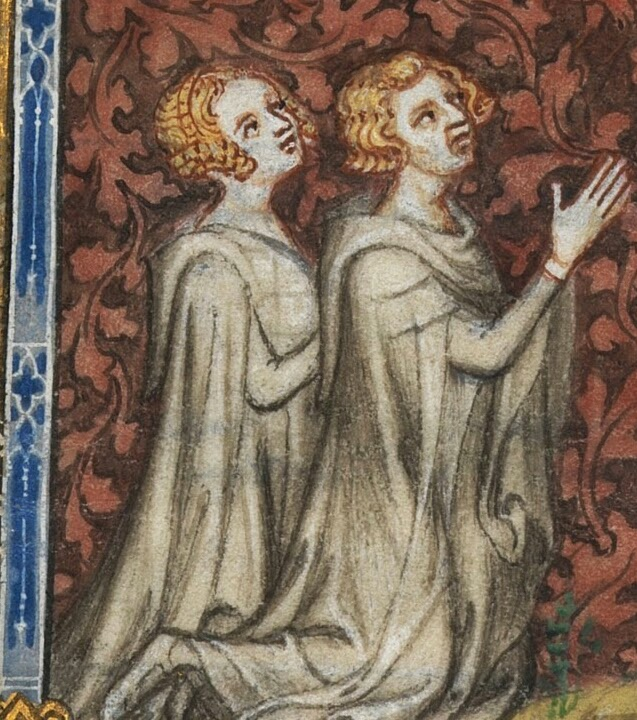
Bonne of Luxembourg with her husband Jean

The book was commissioned for Jutta of Luxembourg, the second daughter of John the Blind, king of Bohemia, and his first wife, Elisabeth of Bohemia, the intended first wife of King John II of France. Bonne died young, before she assumed the position as Queen of France. However, she was mother to Charles V and his brother Jean, duc de Berry. Her arms, showing Luxembourg impaled with Valois, decorate the lower border of the pages. The ornate linings contain a variety of flora and bird species. Jean Le Noir is credited with executing the best-known pages: a crucifixion scene, a double page Memento mori, The Three Living and the Three Dead, and a representation of a highly placed courtier held back by a fool. The work as a whole is noted for its preoccupation with death and its implications thereof.

The artist most associated with the manuscript is Jean Le Noir, active in Paris between 1335 and 1375. Other hands include members of his workshop and possibly his daughter, Bourgot. The style seems influenced by Jean Pucelle.

== Description ==
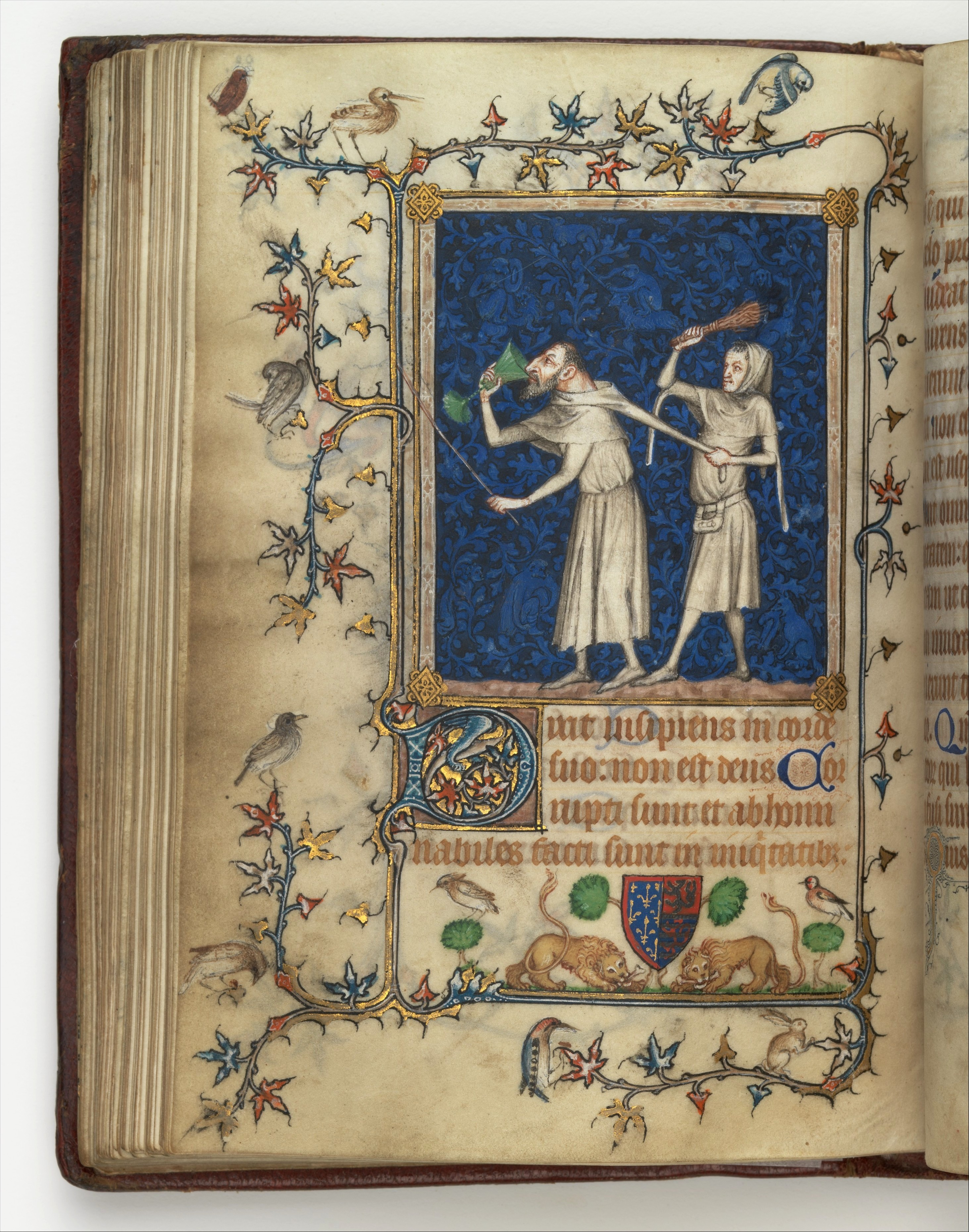
The Fool Hath said in his heart, There is no God, folio 83v

The illustrations are characterised by unusually skilled handling of line, silhouette, and the realistic modelling of the figures. It begins ordinarily enough with a calendar showing traditional scenes of farm labourers and zodiac signs. The main body of the book consists of illustrations of the Psalms. The final pages contain unusual miniatures illustrating prayers, including folio 315, a representation of Divine Love Enthroned. The iconographical elements and themes are unusually dark, specific, and thought to have originated at the request of Jutta, who died thereafter.

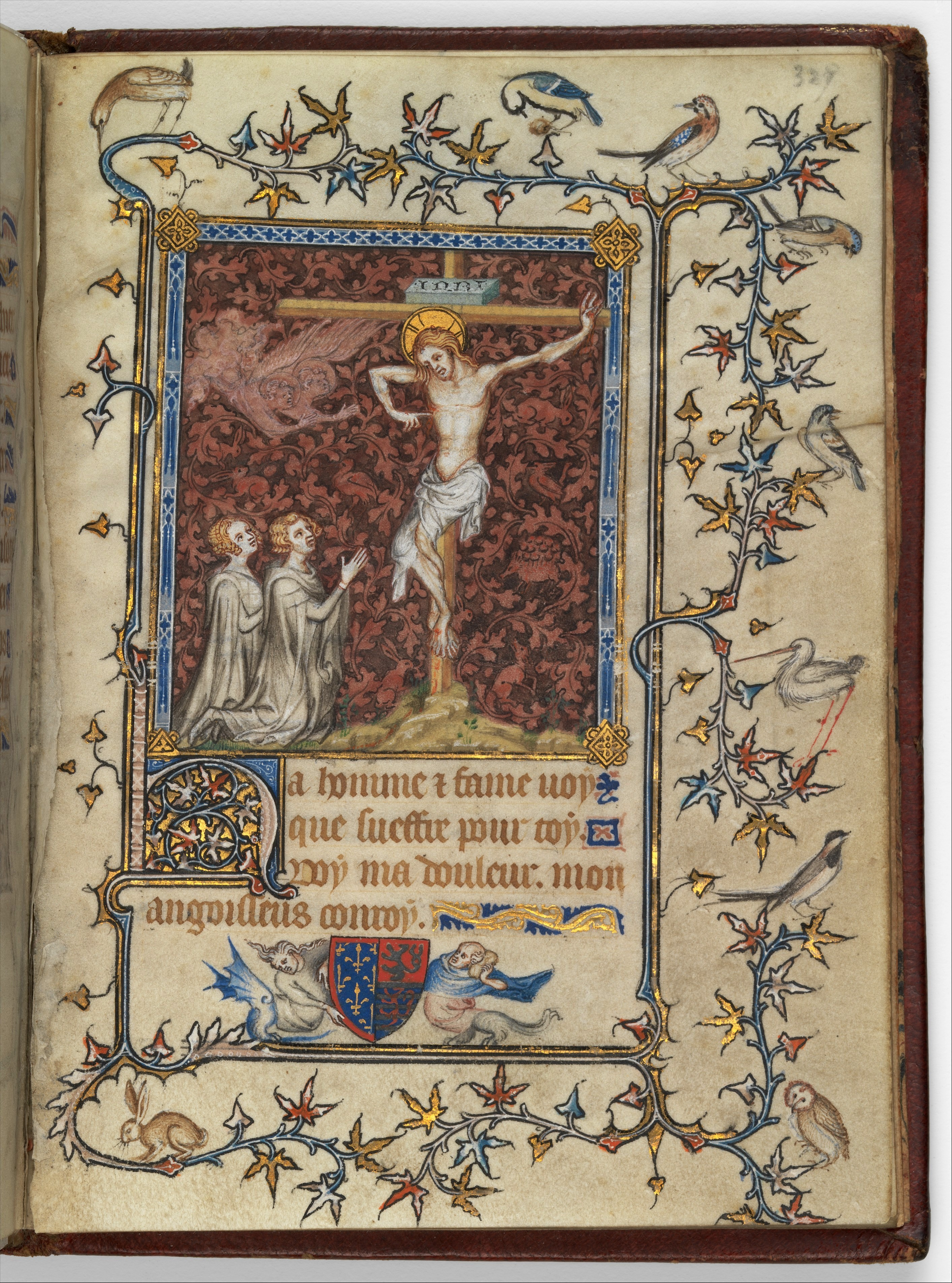
Crucifixion

A crucifixion scene shows two figures kneeling before the crucified Christ. He lays his hands directly on His wounds, described in the accompanying text. In this way, he is depicted as a self-sacrificing God and is painted in a very naturalistic, human manner. The Psalter is thus dated to just before her death in 1349, a period when the Black Death was beginning to spread across Europe. The passages in the manuscript depict the suffering caused by this new plague, and have been described as of "incredible intensity". The most acclaimed two leaves illustrate the Two Fools and the Three Living and the Three Dead, an allegory of transience and a reminder to the viewer of their mortality. This double miniature is one of the first such allegories to appear in northern European art, and seems influenced by the French poets Baudouin de Condé and Nicolas de Margival. The first page depicts three young courtiers who happen across a cemetery, to find three corpses at varying degrees of decomposition. The dead mock the young men's superficial outlook, and in what was to become a classic motif of Memento mori, the accompanying text urges reflection by asking "What you are, we once were; what we are, you will be."

The page margins contain at least two hundred birds of around forty species, mostly depicted three-eighths of an inch or less in size. Most were well and minutely described from life and identifiable; the leaves feature miniature depictions sparrows, finches, larks, among others; some depictions are either fanciful or too badly drawn or indistinct to be believed as from life. The treatment of the birds is so consistent it has been suggested that they were designed by a single hand, although with the weaker examples, he had perhaps been accompanied by a less familiar assistant.

The page illustrating Psalm 53, The Fool Hath said in his heart, There is no God, shows a man drinking from a chalice, a typical attribute of the fool, signifying drunkenness. He is held back by another man who holds his long hood and beats him. This second character probably comes from the tradition of depicting the fool as a yokel or madman clutching a cudgel. The first fool has variously been identified as a drunkard, a monk, and Archbishop Baldwin of Luxembourg. A contemporary viewer would have likely recognised him as a Jew. Both men contain elements of the grotesque, and are executed in grisaille against a deep blue background. The bas-de-page contains two lions gnawing at the Bonne of Luxembourg coat-of-arms.

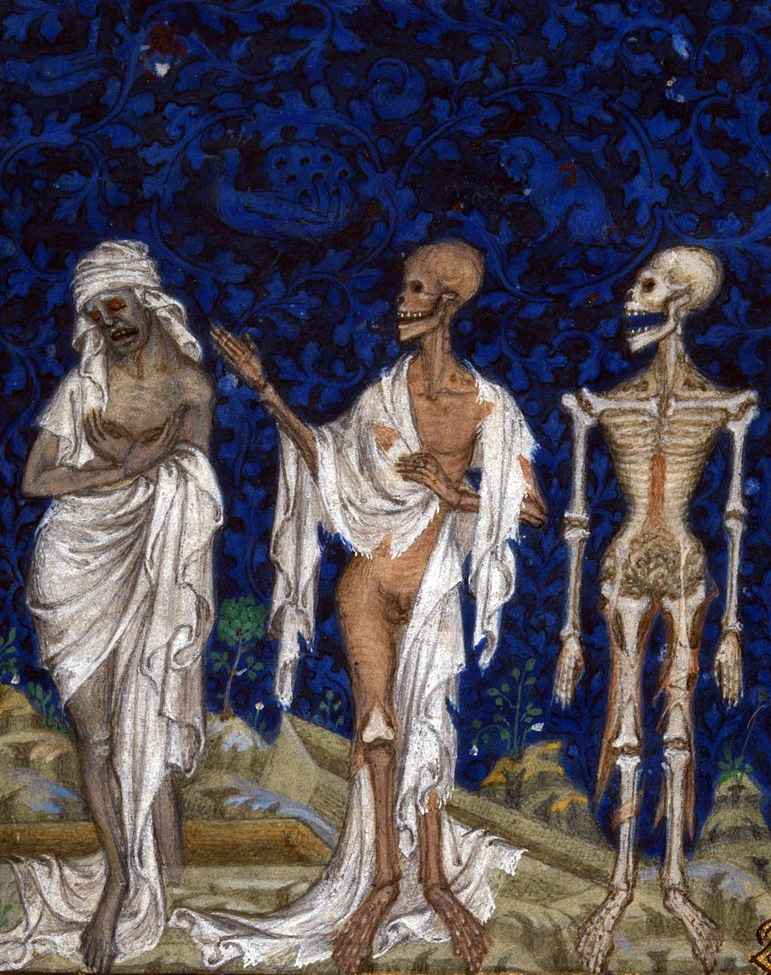
The Three Living and the Three Dead, folio 322r

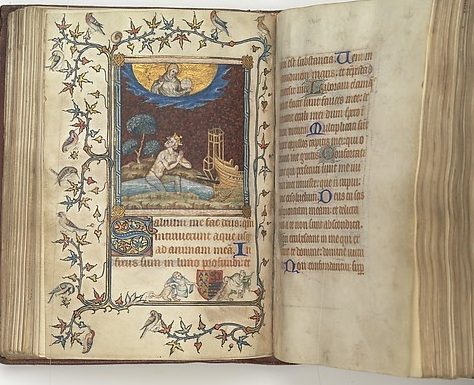
Folio

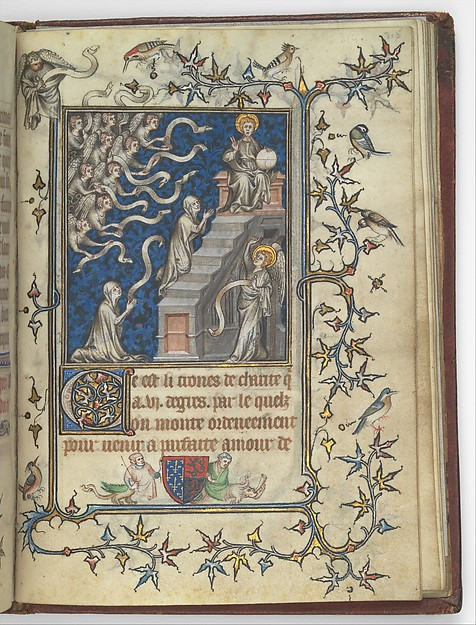
Folio

== Bibliography ==
- Deuchler, Florens. "Looking at Bonne of Luxembourg's Prayer Book". The Metropolitan Museum of Art Bulletin, New Series, Vol. 29, No. 6 (Feb., 1971), pp. 267–278.
- Lermack, Annette. "The Pivotal Role of the Two Fools Miniature in the Psalter of Bonne of Luxembourg". Gesta, Vol. 47, No. 2 (2008), pp. 79–98.
- Little, Charles; Husband, Timothy. "Europe in the Middle Ages". New York: The Metropolitan Museum of Art, 1987. ISBN 978-0-8709-9447-0
- Vaurie, Charles. "Birds in the Prayer Book of Bonne of Luxembourg". The Metropolitan Museum of Art Bulletin, volume 29, no. 6, February 1971
- Walther, Ingo. Codices illustres: The world's most famous illuminated manuscripts. Taschen, 2014. ISBN 978-3-8365-5379-7
- Wixom, William. "Medieval Sculpture at The Cloisters". The Metropolitan Museum of Art Bulletin, volume 46, no. 3, Winter, 1988–1989
