= Henry Alfred Todd =

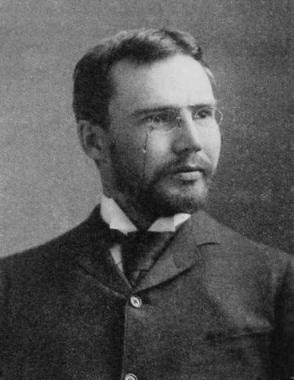
- Born: March 13, 1854; Woodstock, Illinois, US
- Died: January 3, 1925 (aged 70); New York, New York, US
- Resting place: Green Mount Cemetery
- Education: Princeton University
- Occupation: Philologist
- Spouse: Miriam Gilman (m. 1894)
- Children: 4

Henry Alfred Todd, Ph. D. (1854–1925) was an American Romance philologist.

== Biography ==
Henry Alfred Todd was born at Woodstock, Illinois, on March 13, 1854. He was educated at Princeton (A.B., 1876), and at Paris, Berlin, and Madrid, (1880–83), and at Johns Hopkins University (Ph.D., 1885), where he taught for several years. He held the chair or Romance languages at Stanford, 1891–93, and became professor of Romance philology at Columbia.

He married Miriam Gilman in Baltimore on July 30, 1894, and they had four children. His daughter, Martha Clover Todd, married Allen Dulles, later Director of the CIA.

In 1906 he was president of the Modern Language Association of America.

In 1910, with Raymond Weeks and other scholars, he founded the Romanic Review, the first learned review in English devoted entirely to the Romance languages. Among his publications are:

- La panthère d'amours, an allegorical poem of the thirteenth century, by Nicole de Margival, the first text to be edited by a foreigner in the series of the Société des anciens textes français (1883).
- Guillaume de Dole (1887)
- La naissance du Chevalier au Cygne (1889)

Henry Alfred Todd died at his home in New York City on January 3, 1925. He was buried at Green Mount Cemetery in Baltimore.
