= John Audelay =

15th-century English priest and poet

John Audelay (or Awdelay; died c. 1426) was an English priest and poet from Haughmond Abbey, in Shropshire; one of the few English poets of the period whose name is known. Some of the first Christmas carols recorded in English appear among his works.

== Biography ==
The little that is known to us about Audelay's life comes mainly from Oxford, Bodleian Library MS Douce 302. The manuscript contains the text of all sixty-two of his surviving poems. The dialect of Middle English used in MS Douce 302 is local to Staffordshire, and it has been suggested that Audelay may therefore have come from the Staffordshire village of Audley. However, the earliest biographical record of Audelay places him in London in 1417, when he was part of the household of Richard, 7th Baron Strange of Knockin.

Strange was made to do public penance for his involvement in a brawl at St Dunstan-in-the-East church on Easter Sunday in which a parishioner was killed, and was accompanied on his penance by Audelay, his chaplain. Audelay had not only taken part in the penance, but had been present at the incident itself. It has been suggested that the penitential character of Audelay's poetry may have been influenced by his desire to atone for his involvement in Strange's public shame: as the family's chaplain he would have felt particular responsibility.

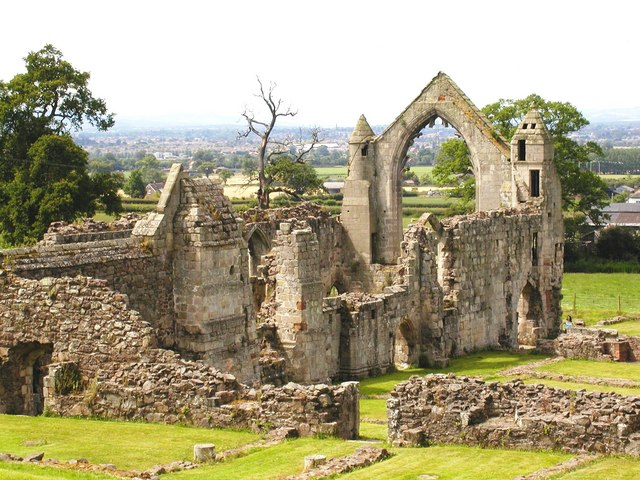
The ruins of Haughmond Abbey.

According to a date noted in MS. Douce 302, by 1426 Audelay was in effective retirement as a chantry priest at Haughmond Abbey. In lines repeated several times throughout the manuscript, Audelay states that he was by that time very old, infirm, deaf, and blind. The manuscript concludes with the following lines of rather rough verse, perhaps composed by the scribe after Audelay's death:

No mon this book he take away,
Ne kutt owt no leef, y say for why;
For hyt is sacrilege, sirus, y ȝow say,
He beth accursed in the dede truly;
Ȝef ȝe wil have any copi,
Askus leeve and ȝe shul have,
To pray for hym specialy,
That hyt made ȝour soules to save,
Jon the blynde Awdelay
The furst prest to the Lord Strange he was,
Of thys chauntré here in this place
That make thys bok by Goddus grace,
Deef, syk, blynd, as he lay,
Cujus anime propicietur Deus

(Translation: None must take this book away / Or cut out any page, I'll tell you why; / For it is sacrilege, sirs, I tell you / He will be accursed in the deed; / If you would have a copy / Ask leave, and you will have, / To pray especially for him / That made it [the book] to save your souls / John the blind Audelay; / He was the first priest [chaplain] to the Lord Strange / Of this chantry / That made this book by the grace of God / As he lay deaf, sick, and blind / On whose soul God have mercy)

It is therefore possible that the manuscript either represents a collection of Audelay's poems assembled on his orders at the end of his life or that it was dictated by him.

== Works ==
Much of Audelay's work as contained in MS. Douce 302 consists of devotional carols (one of which, There is a flower, has been set to music by both John Rutter and Stanley Vann): Audelay is recognised as a significant figure in the history of the English carol. He occasionally takes on more secular themes, such as in a spirited poem in praise of Henry VI, and in a piece titled Cantalena de puericia, writes of the innocence of childhood, wishing he were a child again:

And God wold graunt me my prayer,
A child ayene I wold I were.
Fore pride in herte he hatis all one;
Worchip ne reuerens kepis he non;
Ne he is wroþ with no mon;
In charete is alle his chere. (1–6)

Much of Audelay's poetry is concerned with the theme of repentance; he seems to have had a particular fondness for Saint Winifred, a saint enshrined at Shrewsbury Abbey, who was credited with both the power to free criminals from their shackles (perhaps significant in view of Audelay's possible feelings of guilt over Lestrange's transgression) and the power to cure blindness. Audelay also appears to have been strongly concerned with the exposure of priests to accusations of heresy, and particularly of Lollardy, in the wake of Archbishop Thomas Arundel's Constitutions: he directs an untitled satirical dialogue (usually known as Marcol and Salamon) against certain aspects of the church hierarchy, incorporating references to the great satirical poem Piers Plowman.

The two most remarkable and accomplished poems in the manuscript are both long exercises in a late form of alliterative verse with a superimposed rhyme-scheme: Pater Noster and The Three Dead Kings. Some modern commentators have suggested that these poems cannot be by Audelay, as they show a very high level of technical skill not immediately apparent in other poems in the manuscript, but others have maintained that they were most probably Audelay's own work.
