= Raymond Weeks =

American philologist (1863–1954)

- Born: January 2, 1863; Tabor, Iowa
- Died: 1954 (aged 90–91)
- Occupations: Academic, scholar
- Spouse: Mary Arnoldia

Raymond Weeks (1863–1954) was an American linguist and academic. He was Chair of Romance Languages at the University of Missouri from 1895 to 1908, and later taught at Columbia University in New York City.

== Early life ==
Raymond Weeks was born on January 2, 1863, in Tabor, Iowa. He was educated at Price High School in Kansas City, Missouri. He received a Bachelor of Arts degree from Harvard University in 1890 and a master's degree in 1891.

== Career ==
Weeks taught French at the University of Michigan from 1891 to 1893. He studied in Paris from 1895 to 1897 on a Harvard Traveling Fellowship. In 1895, he was appointed as Chair of Romance Languages at the University of Missouri, where he served until 1908. During that time, he received his Ph.D. from Harvard University in 1897. From 1908 to 1909, he was Professor of Romance Languages at the University of Illinois.

Weeks joined the faculty at Columbia University in New York City in 1909. In 1910, he founded, in collaboration with Henry Alfred Todd and other scholars, the Romanic Review, and he became general editor of the "Oxford French Series." He wrote numerous articles in Old French Literature, and was assistant editor on the New Standard Dictionary (1913).

During World War I, he served in the American Field Service in France for six months. He became a Knight of the Legion of Honour in 1919.

== Personal life ==
He married Mary Arnoldia in 1885.

== Death ==
He died in 1954.

== Bibliography ==
- Origin of the Covenant Vivien (1902)
- La Chevalerie Vivien, facsimile edition (1909)
- The N.E.A. Phonetic Alphabet (1912), with J. W. Bright and C. H. Grandent
- The Hound-Tuner of Callaway, (1927), By Columbia University Press
