= Bourgot Le Noir =

French artist

Bourgot Le Noir was a French female illuminator in the mid-fourteenth century who assisted her father, Jean Le Noir, with his work.

While it is impossible to discern which hands created each individual work, it is very plausible that Bourgot's work is interspersed with her father's. The collaboration of father and daughter is significant and marks the beginning of an increase of women in the Bruges painter's guild records, which was found to be 12 percent female in 1454, and continued to grow to 25 percent by the later 1400s.

== Biography ==
Little is known about the personal life of Bourgot Le Noir, and she is not commonly known to the general art history community. However, with the existing documents mentioning her, it is known that she was an elumineresse that collaborated with Jean Le Noir, her father, to illustrate manuscripts in the mid-fourteenth century. Bourgot Le Noir was taught to paint by her father and was employed in his shop. Their work included prayer books, books of hours, and other illuminations. Later in her illuminating career, Bourgot and her father moved to Paris, where their prestigious patrons included John the Good, King of France and Jean, Duc de Berry.

== Style ==
Bourgot and Jean Le Noir's style closely followed the works of Jean Pucelle, but their art deviated into "a more sturdy expressionism," while still "delicious and delicate." This influence is shown by the decorative, colorful backgrounds, the images around the margins, and the shades of gray used in the paintings (grisaille) all point to Pucelle's style.

== Works and Patrons ==
Works known to have been made by the Le Noir duo include a book of hours for Yolande de Flandres and a prayer book for Bonne of Luxembourg, the wife of John the Good. Their patrons are also known to include Jean, Duc de Berry and Charles V, both impressive historical figures of their time.

== Significance ==
Bourgot helps pave the way for future women artists by participating in her field. With women becoming more active in the art community, the number of women in the painters' guild in Bruges shot to 25 percent of artists overall in the 1400s. Furthermore, the extent of this field helped continue the birth of painting miniatures in the sixteenth century.
