= La Ferté-Loupière =

- Commune
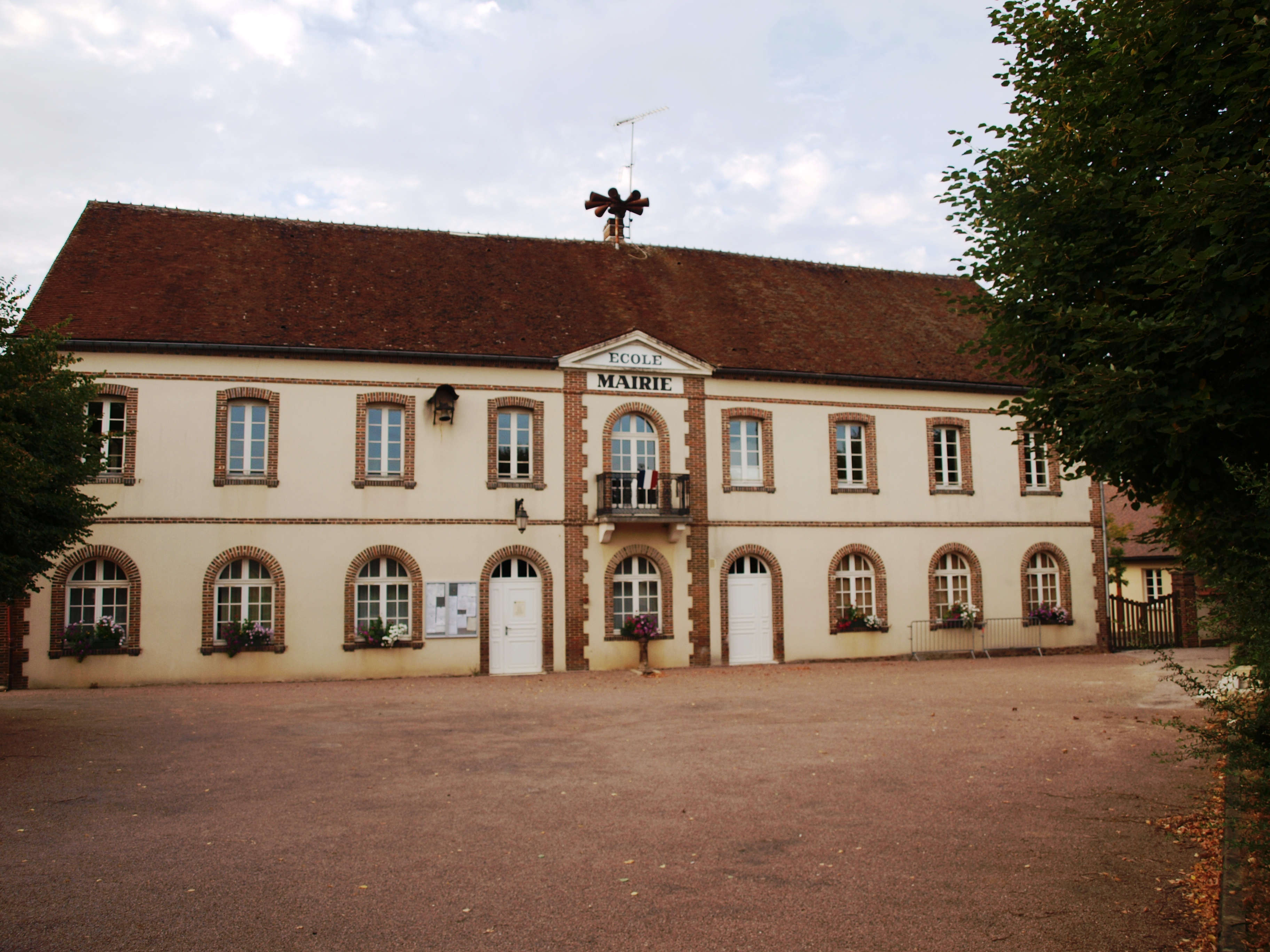
- The town hall in La Ferté-Loupière

- Coat of arms
- Location of La Ferté-Loupière
- Location within France Location within Bourgogne-Franche-Comté
- Coordinates: 47°53′47″N 3°14′10″E
- Country: France
- Region: Bourgogne-Franche-Comté
- Department: Yonne
- Arrondissement: Auxerre
- Canton: Charny Orée de Puisaye

Government
  - Mayor (2022–2026): Séverine Carron-Fermier
- Area^{1}: 30.48 km^{2} (11.77 sq mi)
- Highest elevation: 233 m (764 ft)
- Lowest elevation: 132 m (433 ft)
- Population (2023): 559
  - Density: 18.3/km^{2} (47.5/sq mi)
- Time zone: UTC+01:00 (CET)
  - Summer (DST): UTC+02:00 (CEST)
- INSEE/Postal code: 89163 /89110
- ^{1} French Land Register data, which excludes lakes, ponds, glaciers > 1 km^{2} (0.386 sq mi or 247 acres) and river estuaries.

La Ferté-Loupière (French pronunciation: [la fɛʁte lupjɛʁ]) is a commune in the Yonne department in Bourgogne-Franche-Comté in north-central France. The village is famous for its danse macabre, dating back from the beginning of the 16th century, in the church of Saint-Germain.

== See also ==
- Communes of the Yonne department
