= Jean Le Noir (illuminator) =

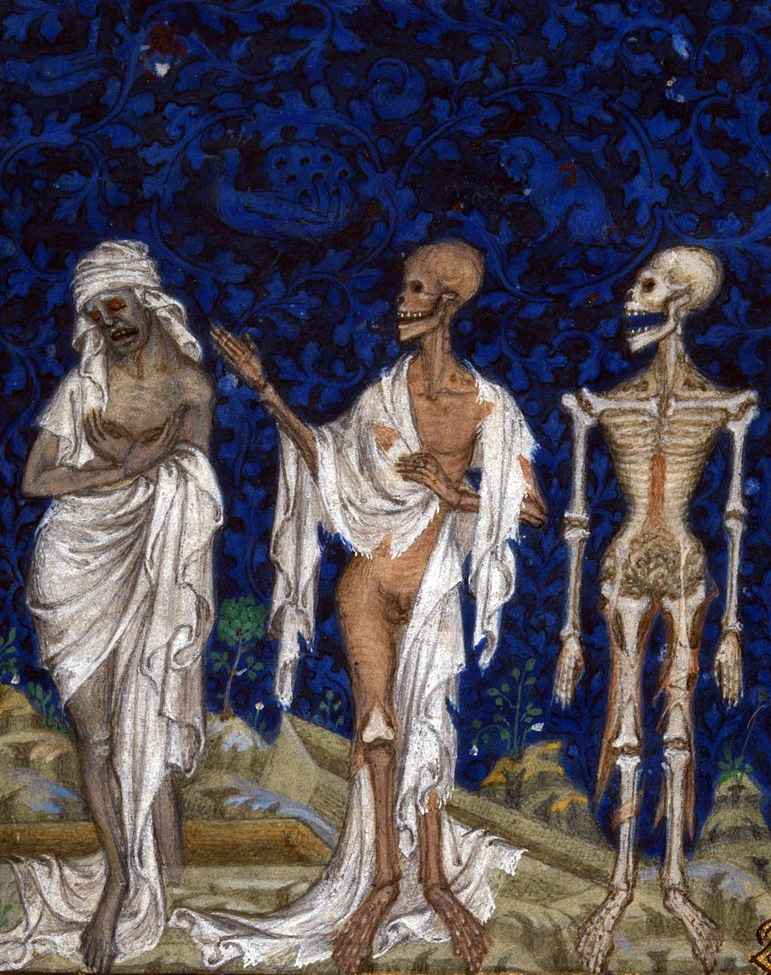
Jean Le Noir, The Three Living and the Three Dead, folio 322r, Psalter of Bonne de Luxembourg (c. 1348–49, New York, The Cloisters, Inv. 69. 86.)

Jean Le Noir was a French manuscript illuminator active in Paris between 1335 and 1380. He was a pupil of Jean Pucelle. His main work is the Psalter of Bonne de Luxembourg (c. 1348–1349, New York, The Cloisters, Inv. 69.86).

Jean le Noir's daughter Bourgot (fr) assisted with much of his work.

In 1331 he was in service to Yolande of Flanders, Countess of Bar, Duchess of Bar, and later to the King. As reward for their services, Jean and Bourgot were given a house in Paris in 1358 by the King's son, the future Charles V, for whom they also worked after he ascended the throne in 1364. During the early 1370s Jean and Bourgot worked at Bourges for the Duke of Berry, who also held them in high esteem.

== Bibliography ==
- (in French) François Avril, L'enluminure à la cour de France au XIVe siècle, Paris, Chêne, 1978.
- (in French) Charles Sterling, La peinture médiévale à Paris, 1300–1500, Paris, Bibliothèque des arts, 1990.
- (in French) Erwin Panofsky, Les primitifs flamands, Paris, Hazan, 1992.
- Avril, F (1978). Manuscript Painting at the Court of France.
