= Nicole de Margival =

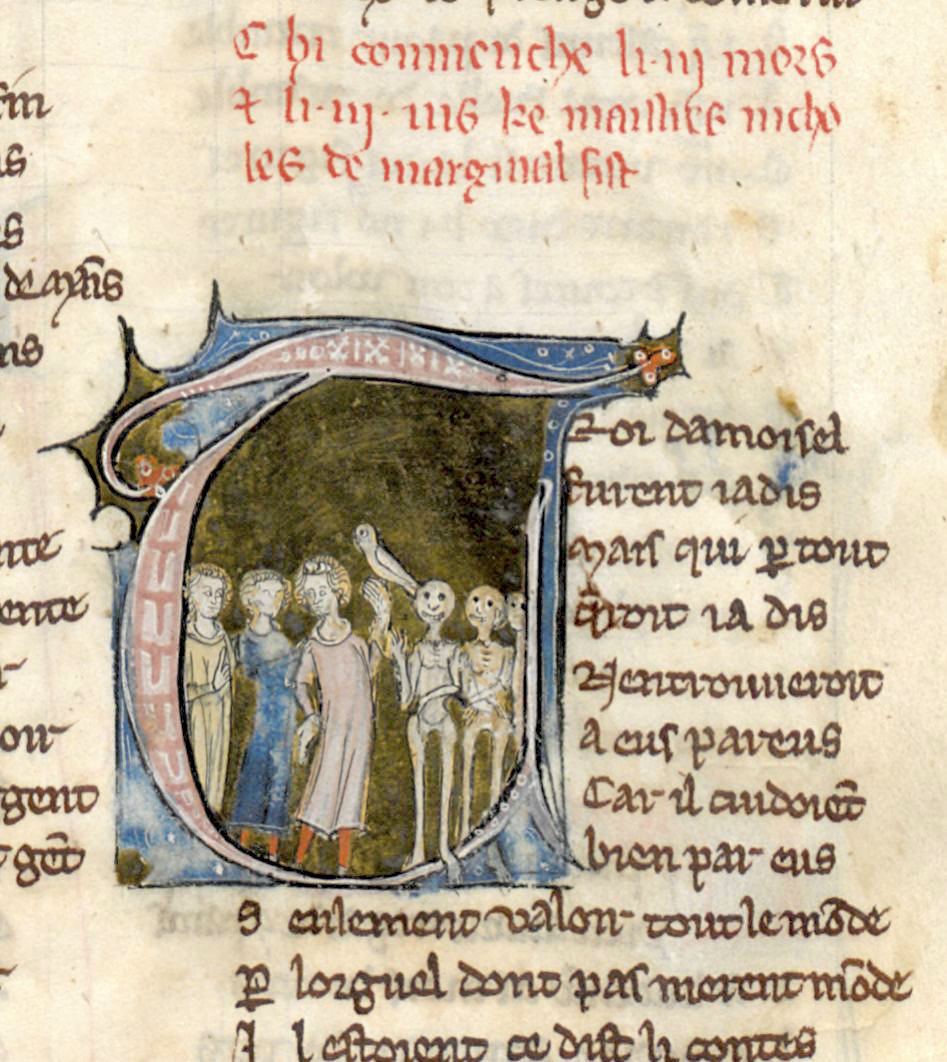
Les trois mors et les trois vis

Nicole de Margival (fl. c. 1300) was an Old French poet. His two known works are Le Dit de la panthère d'amours ('the narrative of the panther of love') and Les trois mors et les trois vis ('the three dead and the three living').

== Le Dit de la panthère d'amours ==
Nicole's major work is Le Dit de la panthère d'amours, a narrative poem, or dit, in 2,672 lines. It was written after 1290, since it cites Drouart La Vache's translation of Andreas Capellanus' De amore, and before 1328, when two copies of it were catalogued in the library of Clementia of Hungary. It belongs to the medieval encyclopedic tradition.

The narrator of the Panthère begins by asserting the truth of dreams, before falling asleep and being carried off by birds in a dream to a valley of animals. There the beautiful panther attracts other animals with the fragrance of its breath. The narrator falls in love with it but it flees. Attracted by the music at the court of the God of Love, he becomes the god's vassal. Led back to the valley, he encounters the panther but is dumbstruck. Paralysed by self-doubt, he receives coaching from the goddess Venus. The God of Love, however, declares that his only hope is Fortune, whereupon the panther comes to him in the company of Good Will, Mercy and Pity. He then wakes up.

The Panthère is thick with quotations, references and allusions to other texts. Explicitly cited are the Roman de la rose, Drouart's translation of De amore and a lapidary by the unidentified Jehan L'Épicier. There is scholarly disagreement over whether Nicole used only the original Rose of Guillaume de Lorris or also the continuation of Jean de Meun. Since Nicole is the only author to cite Drouart's translation, it has been suggested that the two authors knew each other. The Panthère incorporates some verses from the grands chants courtois of Adam de la Halle while praising the poet. Neither does Nicole acknowledge the influence of two Italian works, Brunetto Latini's Tesoretto and Dante Alighieri's De vulgari eloquentia, although in places his work borders on translation of the Tesoretto. In addition, Sylvia Huot describes Richard de Fournival's Bestiaire d'amours as "a powerful implicit presence".

The Panthère is usually regarded as "poorly written and unoriginal", but it "includes rich and equivocal rhyme". It is preserved in two manuscripts, one in Paris and one in Saint-Petersburg.

== Les trois mors et les trois vis ==
Les trois mors et les trois vis is a variation of the legend of the Three Dead and the Three Living in 216 lines. It "is a showcase of poetic virtuosity". It is known from three manuscripts, two complete copies in Paris and a fragment in the manuscript Chantilly 1942.

== Bibliography ==
- Brun, Laurent; Ribémont, Bernard (2023). "Nicole de Margival". Archives de Littérature du Moyen Âge.
- Huot, Sylvia (2019). From Song to Book: The Poetics of Writing in Old French Lyric and Lyrical Narrative Poetry. Cornell University Press. Archived from the original on July 10, 2021.
- Patch, Howard R. [in Spanish] (1927). The Goddess Fortuna in Mediaeval Literature. Harvard University Press.
- Ribémont, Bernard, ed. (2000). Le dit de la panthère. Champion.
- Todd, Henry Alfred, ed. (1883). Le dit de la panthère d'amours. Paris.
- Zingesser, Eliza (2012). "The Vernacular Panther: Encyclopedism, Citation, and French Authority in Nicole de Margival's Dit de la panthère". Modern Philology. 109 (3): 301–311. doi:10.1086/663278. S2CID 162816471.
