= Altarpiece with Christ, Saint John the Baptist, and Saint Margaret =

Sculpture by Andrea da Giona

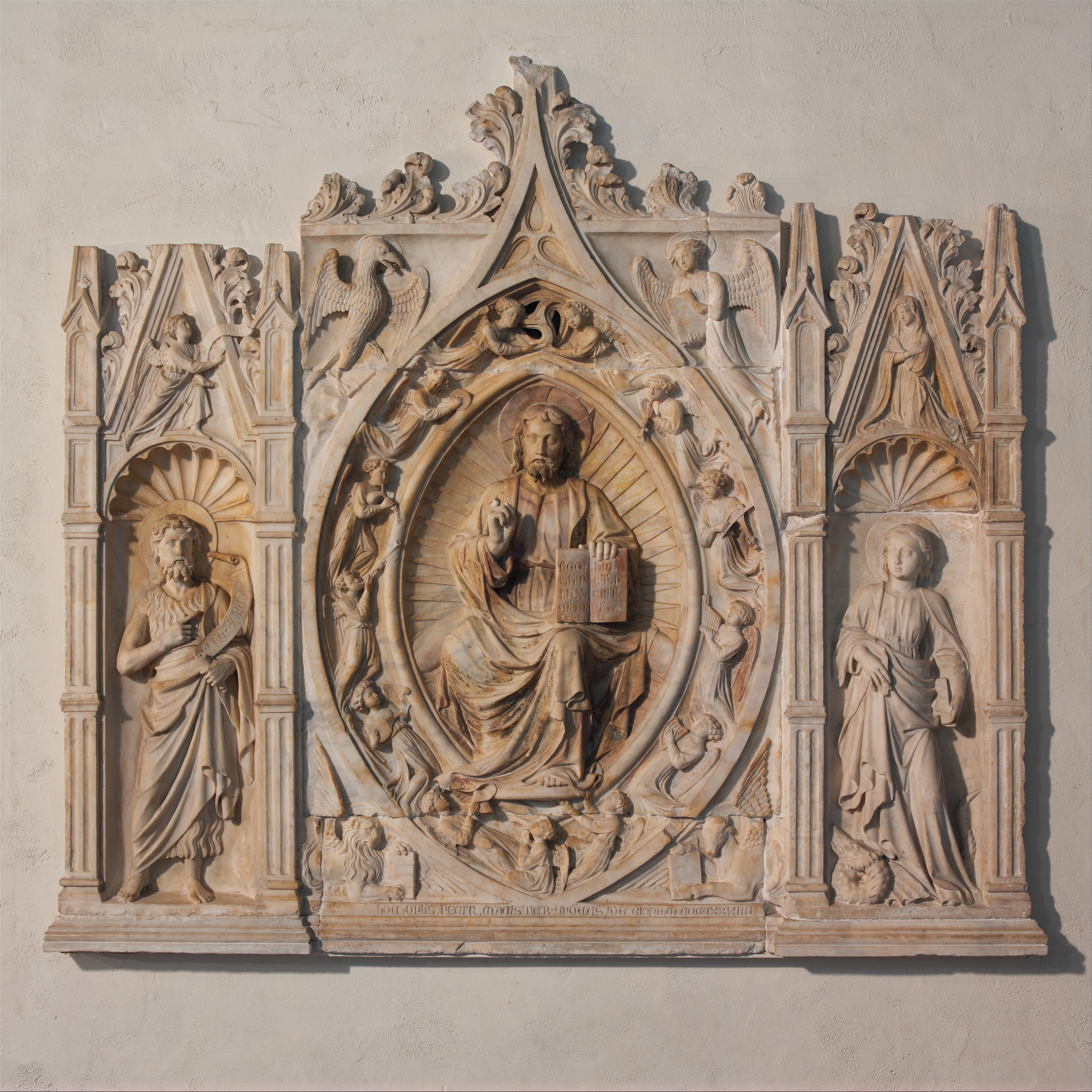
The altarpiece

The Altarpiece with Christ, Saint John the Baptist, and Saint Margaret is an autographed 1434 sculpture in Carrara marble by the Italian artist Andrea da Giona, now in the collection of The Cloisters in New York City. It was commissioned by the Knights of Malta, a band of Christian sailors preoccupied with defending Spain from Muslim invasion.

The carving is in the late International Gothic style, as evidenced by its folds of draperies, lush foliates, and the heavily idealised facial types of the main saints.

Christ in Majesty is at the center, flanked by the Virgin Mary and the angel Gabriel, with other angels playing musical instruments. The four Evangelists are placed at each corner. Inscriptions below the central panel read "HOC OPUS FECIT MAGISTER AND[R]EAS DA GIONA MCCCCXXXIIII" (This work was made by Master Andrea from Giona 1434).

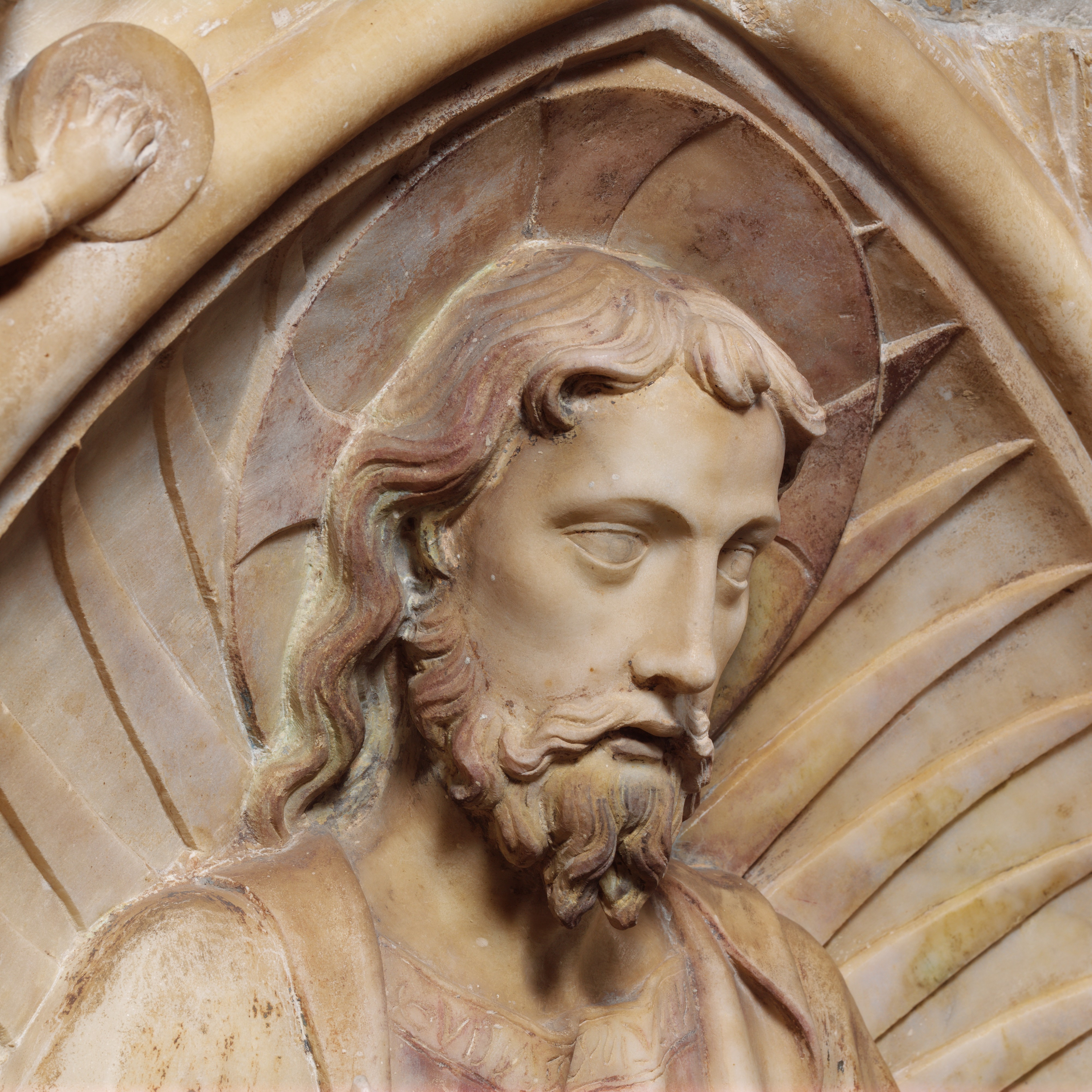
Detail of the sculpture of Christ

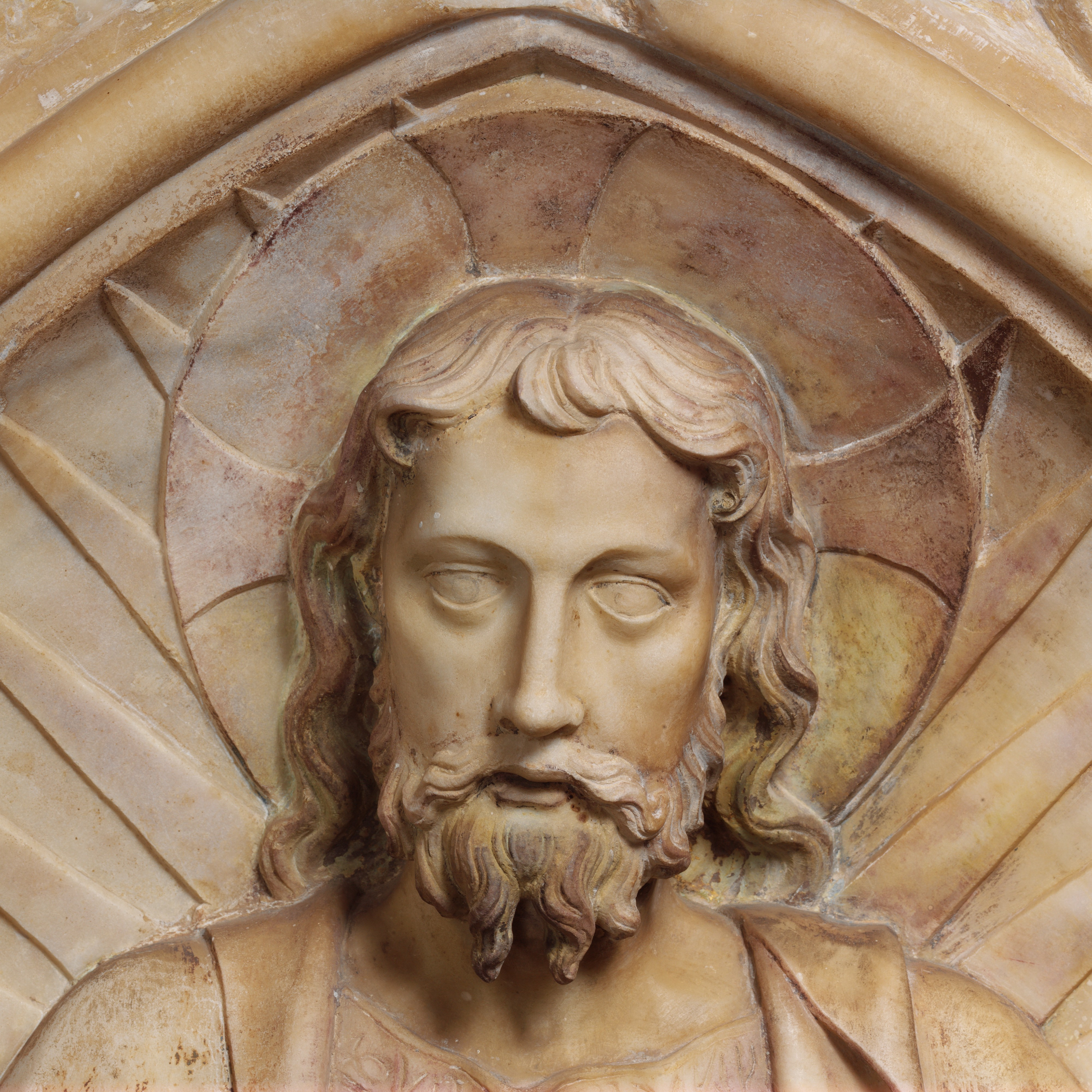
Detail of the sculpture of Christ

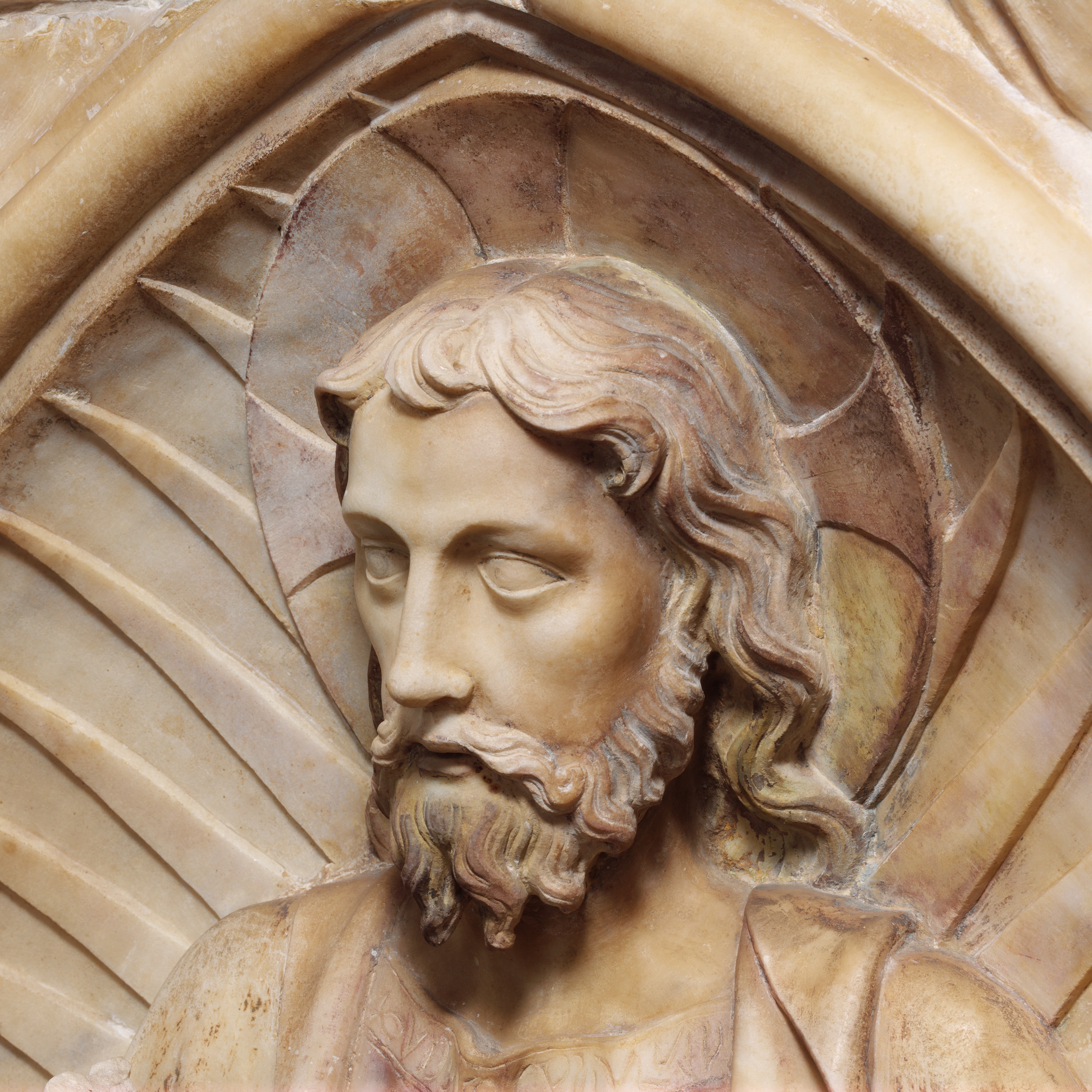
Detail of the sculpture of Christ
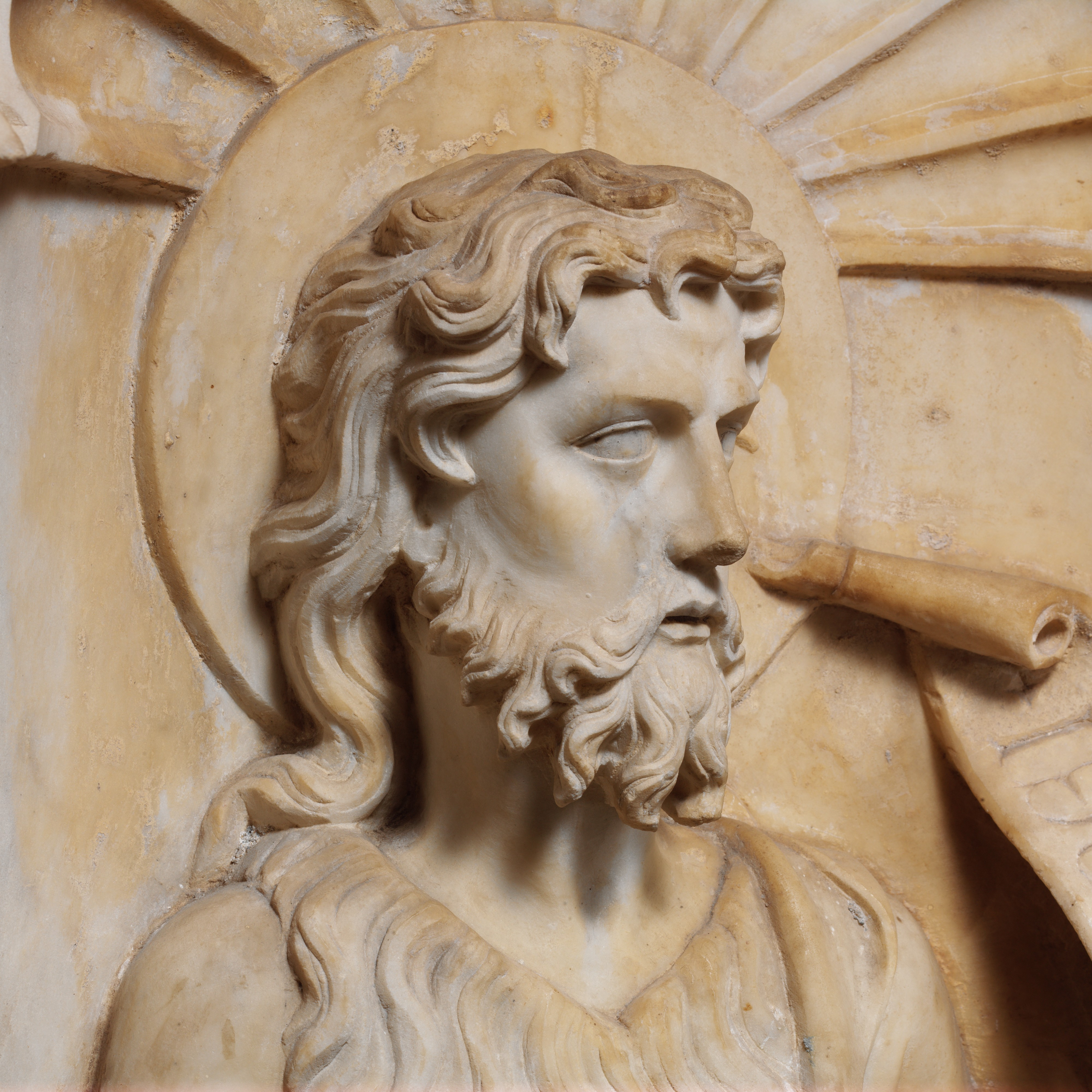
Detail of the sculpture of Saint John the Baptist

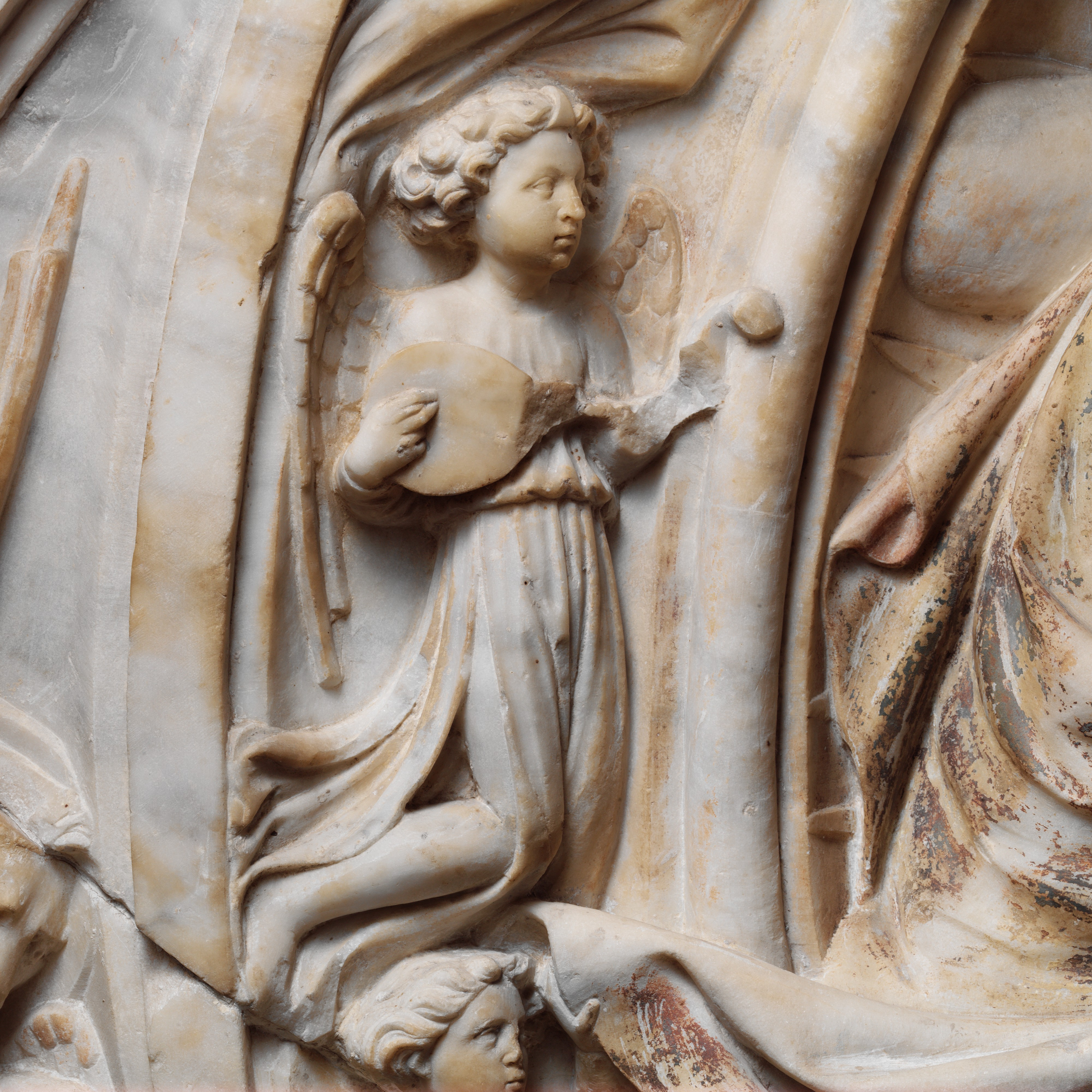
Detail of the sculpture of a musical angel

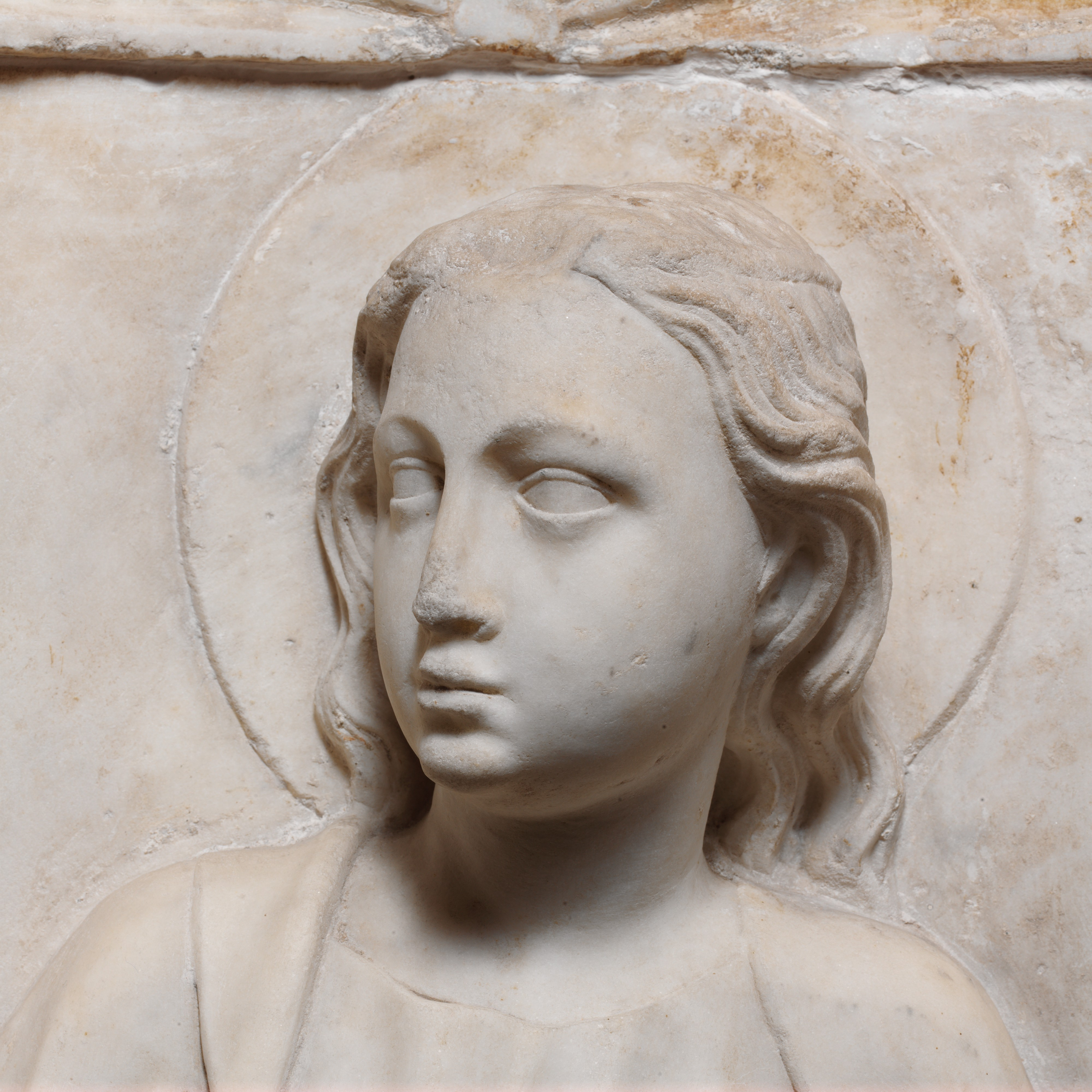
Detail of the sculpture of Saint Margaret

== Sources ==
- Wixom, William. "Medieval Sculpture at The Cloisters". The Metropolitan Museum of Art Bulletin, volume 46, no. 3, Winter, 1988–1989
