= Madonna of Nesvačily =

Wooden statue of Madonna in Prague

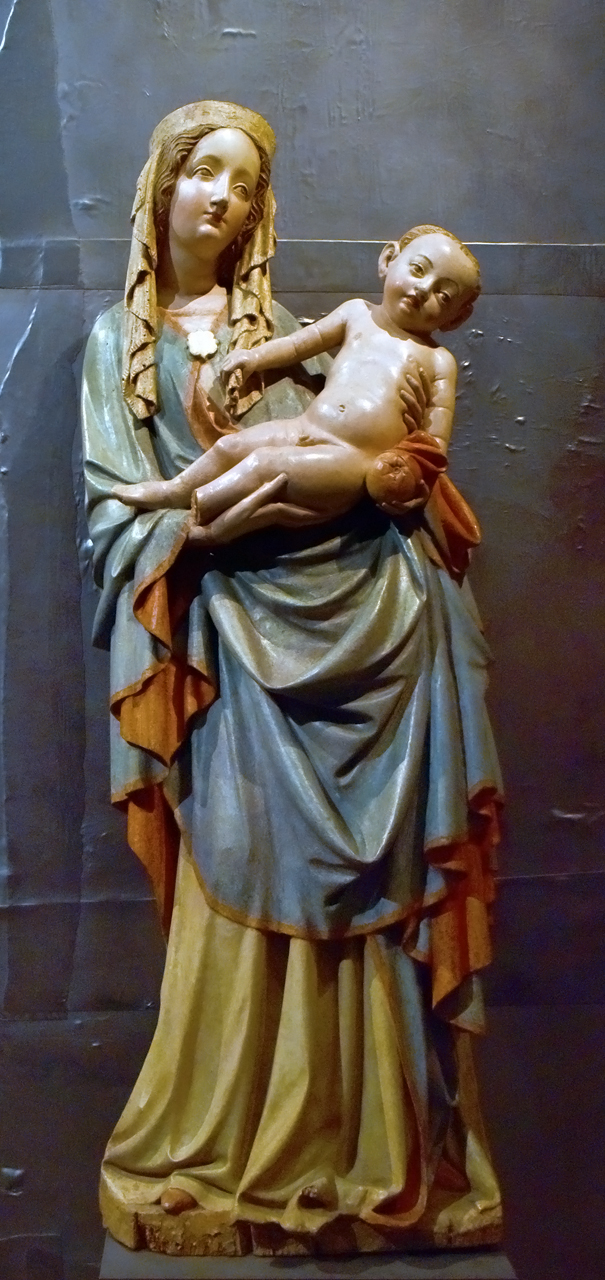
Madonna of Nesvačily (around 1420–1430), National Gallery in Prague

The Madonna of Nesvačily (around 1410) is one of the finest wooden beautiful madonnas of the late beautiful style in Bohemia. It is considered a younger replica of the Madonna of Plzeň. The so-called Master of the Nesvačily sculptures, who was probably trained in the workshop of the Master of the Týn Calvary, has been identified as the author. The statue comes from the Church of the Finding of the Holy Cross in Nesvačily and is on display in the exposition of medieval art of the National Gallery in Prague.

== Description and classification ==
The statue is made of lime wood, carved also on the rear side, with old (possibly original) polychromy, height 137 cm. Restored by F. Kotrba (1946).

The author was a carver of distinguished qualities, who in a somewhat more rigid and cumbersome form used the classical scheme of the beautiful style with great confidence. The Madonna in a pronounced S-like bend holds the child on her side above her left foot, but the rhythm of movement has stopped and the face lacks the former liveliness of expression. The basic symmetrical scheme of the drapery with its bowl-like folds, zigzag depressions, two cascades of tubular folds at the sides and a horizontal border at knee level originated in the Parler workshop. The type of the obliquely reclining naked child presented to the faithful by the Virgin Mary also dates from the 1480s. The massive, fully sculpted and blocky figure with a faint contrapposto is composed for a frontal view. An original variation of the detail known from the Krumlov Madonna is the protruding tip of the cloak, which the Child Jesus holds with his left hand, in which he is clutching an apple. The sculptor also used other widely used motifs - for example, the gesture with which Jesus holds his mother's veil (which represents the symbol of Mary's virginity before and after childbirth), or the motif of the large lower fold of the garment with the 'nose'. However, this is not an eclectic adoption of patterns, nor a mere reduction of the complex shape of the Madonna of Plzeň, but rather a new formulation of a traditional type.

In the style of carving, the statue is related to some of the works of the Master of Týn Calvary - e.g. the Virgin Mary from Dumlos Calvary and the Madonna from the Church of St. Elizabeth (left side with a cascade of folds), or St. John the Evangelist from Týn Calvary (parts of the knee of the free leg). The motif of the drapery fold on the front side is identical to the Madonna from the Franciscan Church in Plzeň (1415), also close to the workshop of the Master of Týn Calvary. According to some art historians, the author of the statue was a carver who worked in this workshop and became independent around 1410.

== Gallery ==
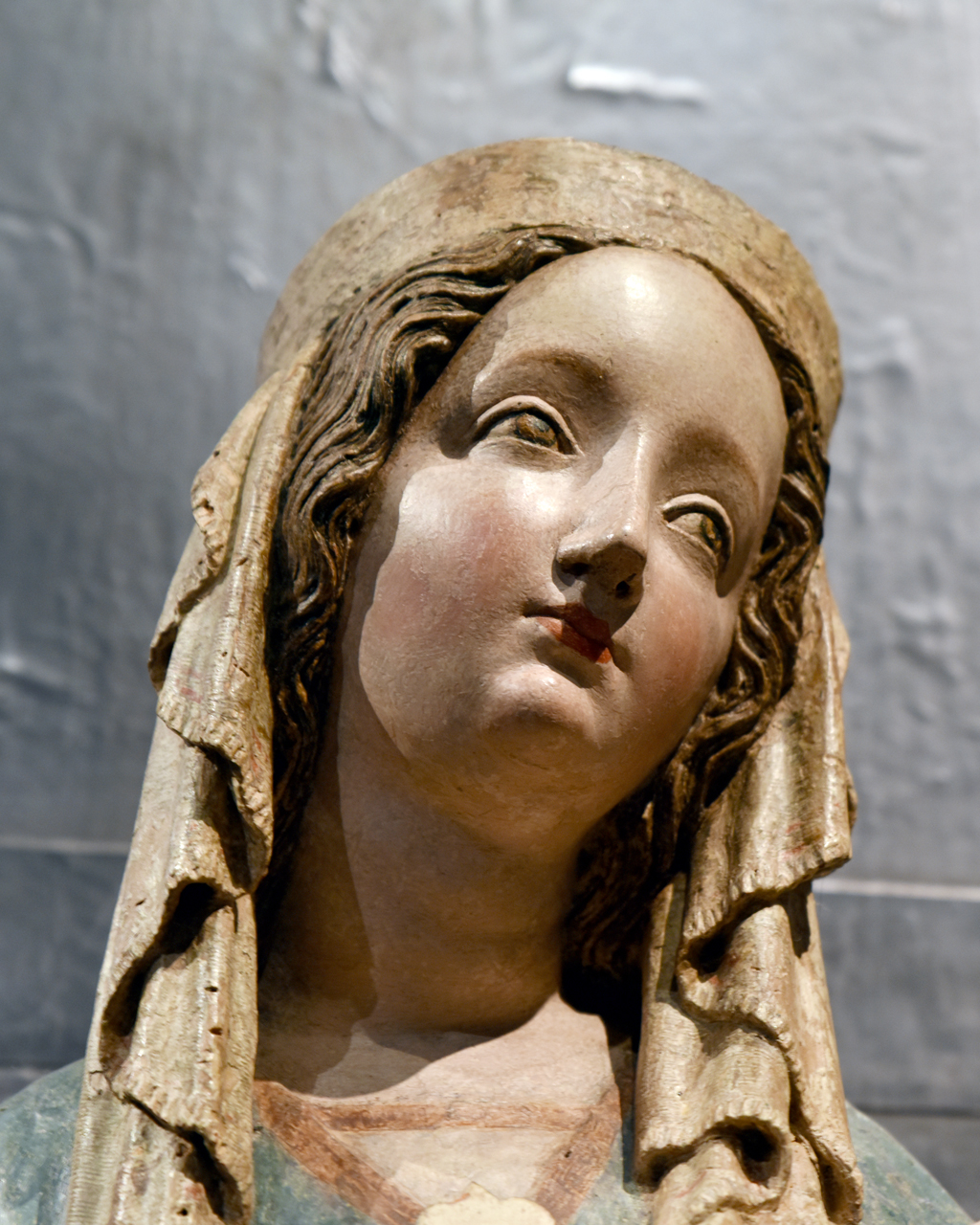
Detail of head

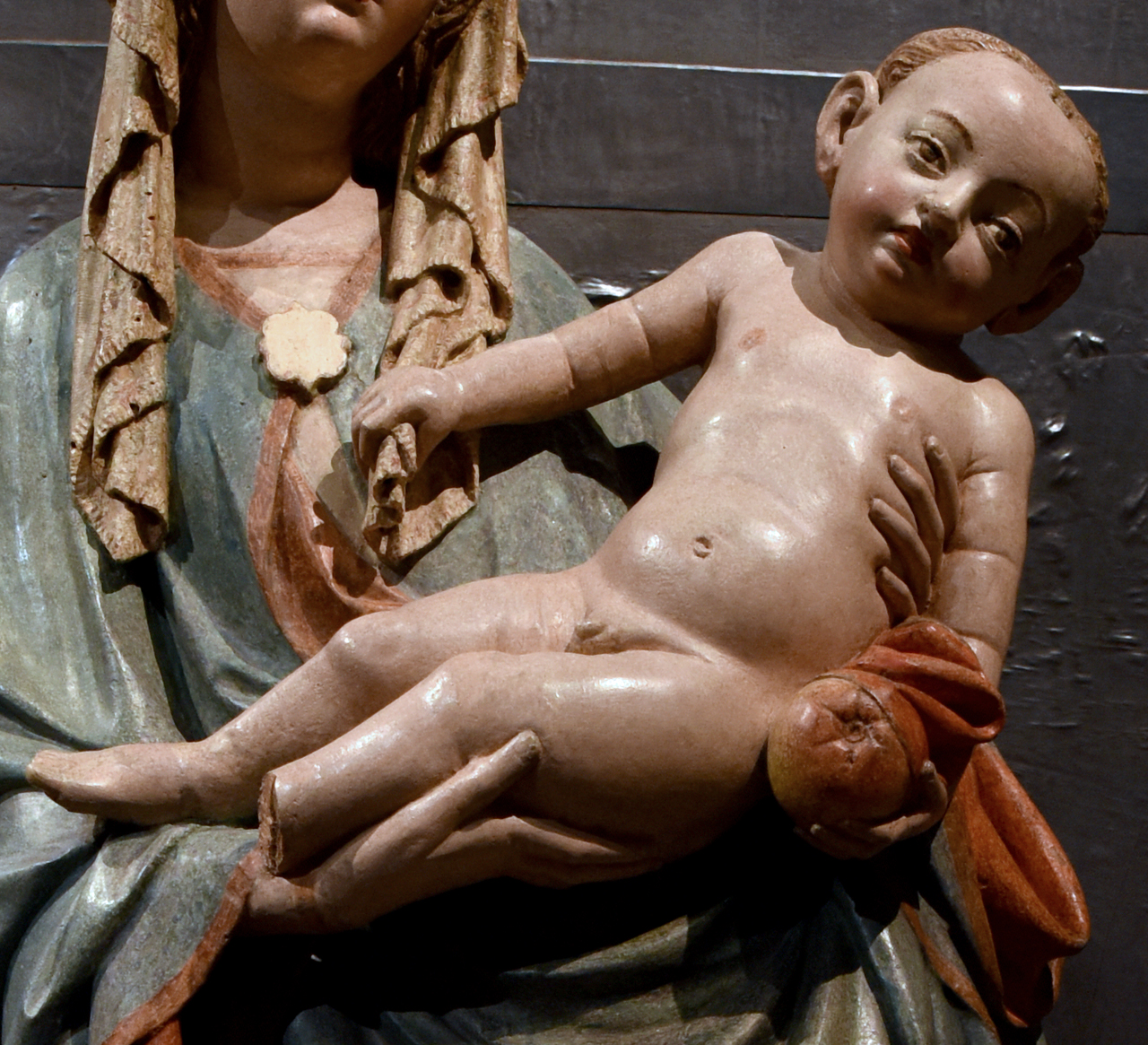
Detail of Jesus

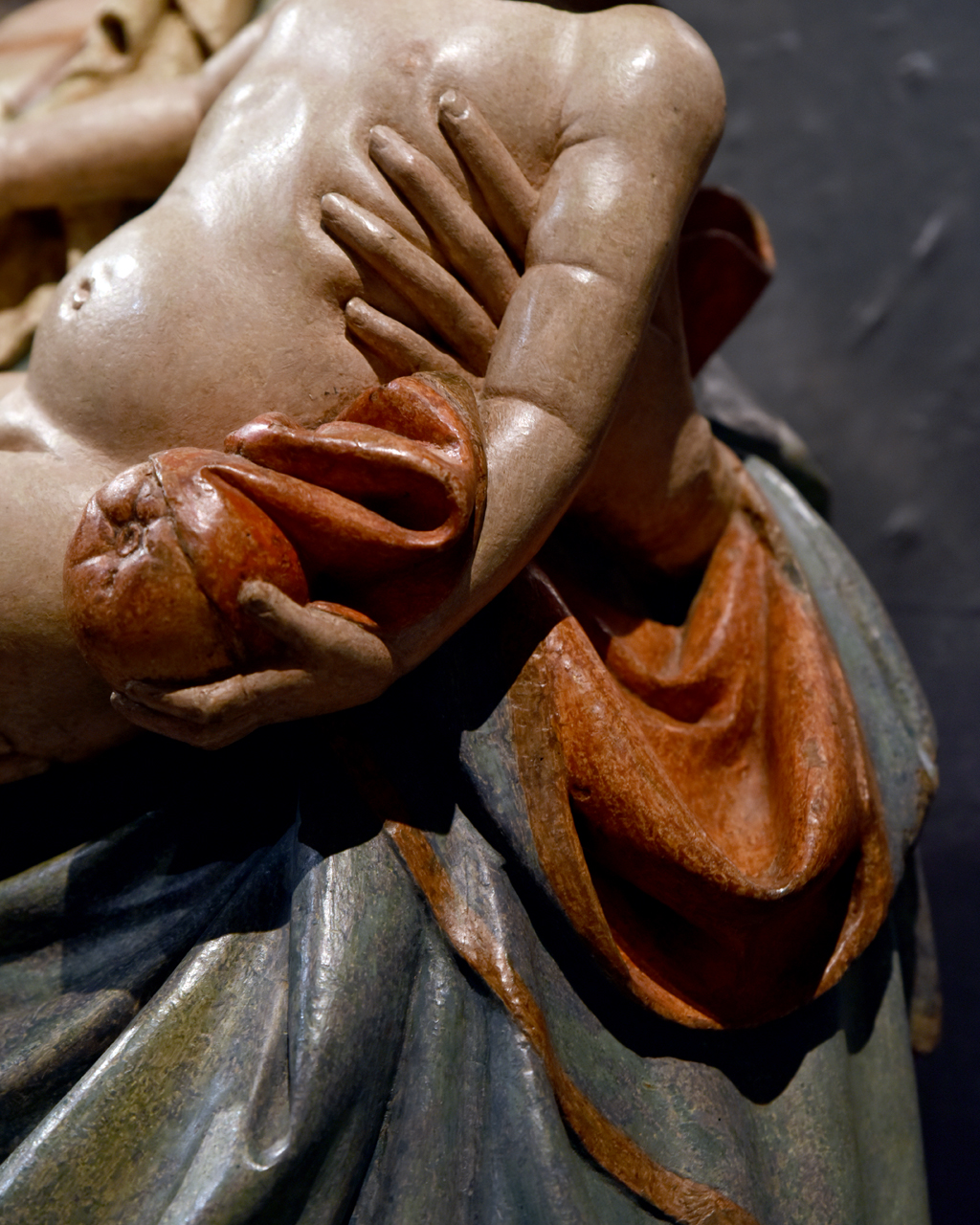
Detail of the tip of the cloak and apple

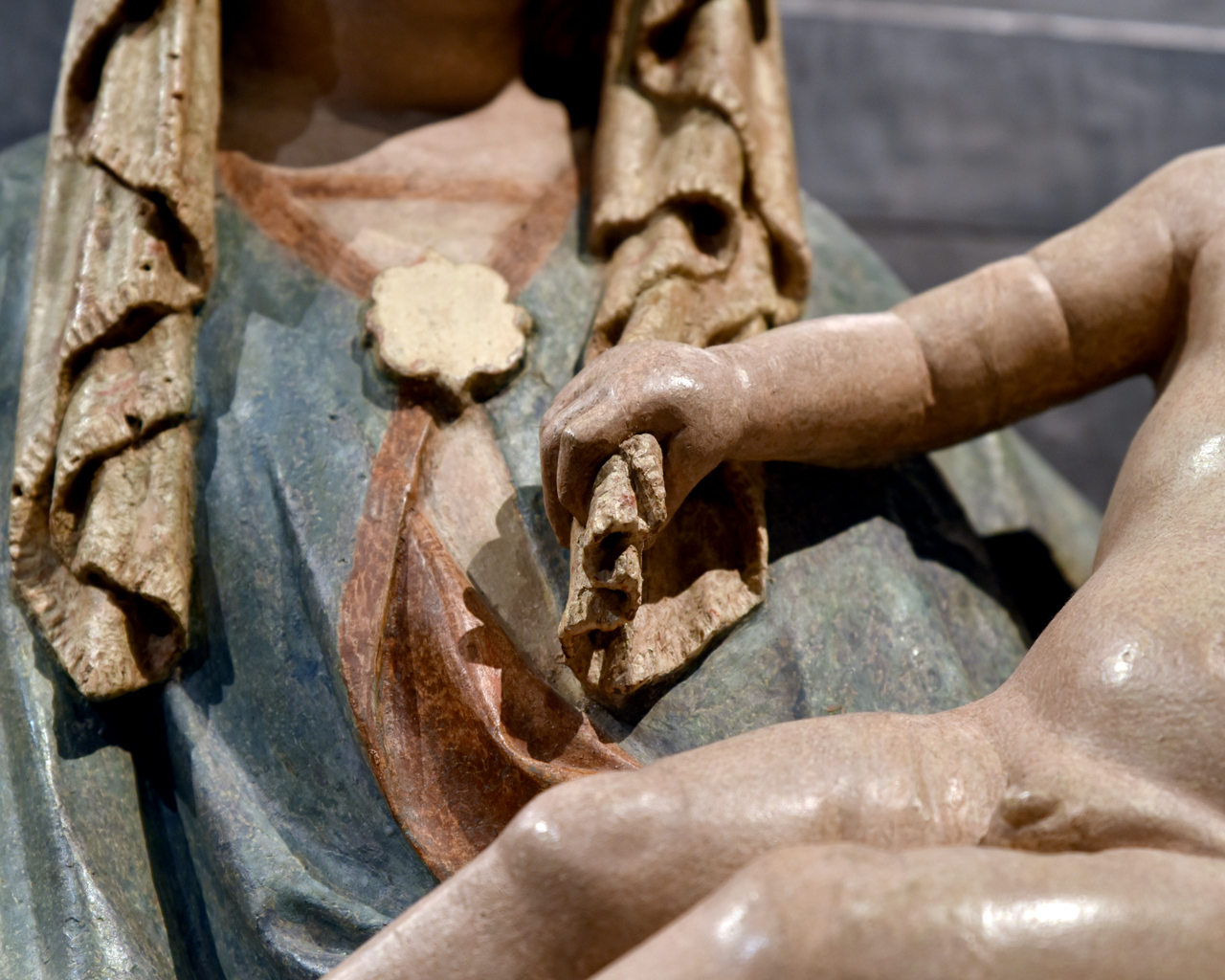
Detail of the veil and the right hand of Jesus

== Sources ==
- Homolka Jaromír, Chlíbec Jan, Šteflová Milena: Master of Týn Calvary, catalogue of the National Gallery exhibition, Prague 1990
- Albert Kutal, Gothic Sculpture, in: History of Czech Fine Arts I, Academia, Prague 1984
- Jaromír Homolka, Sculpture, in: Poche, Emanuel, Medieval Prague: four books about Prague. 1st ed. Panorama, Prague 1983
- Albert Kutal, Czech Gothic Art, Artia/Obelisk Prague 1972
- Albert Kutal, Sculpture, in: Kavka F (ed.), Czech Gothic Art 1350–1420, Academia, Prague 1970
- Albert Kutal, Czech Gothic Sculpture 1350–1450, SNKLU, Prague, 1962
