= International Gothic =

Art style, form of Gothic art

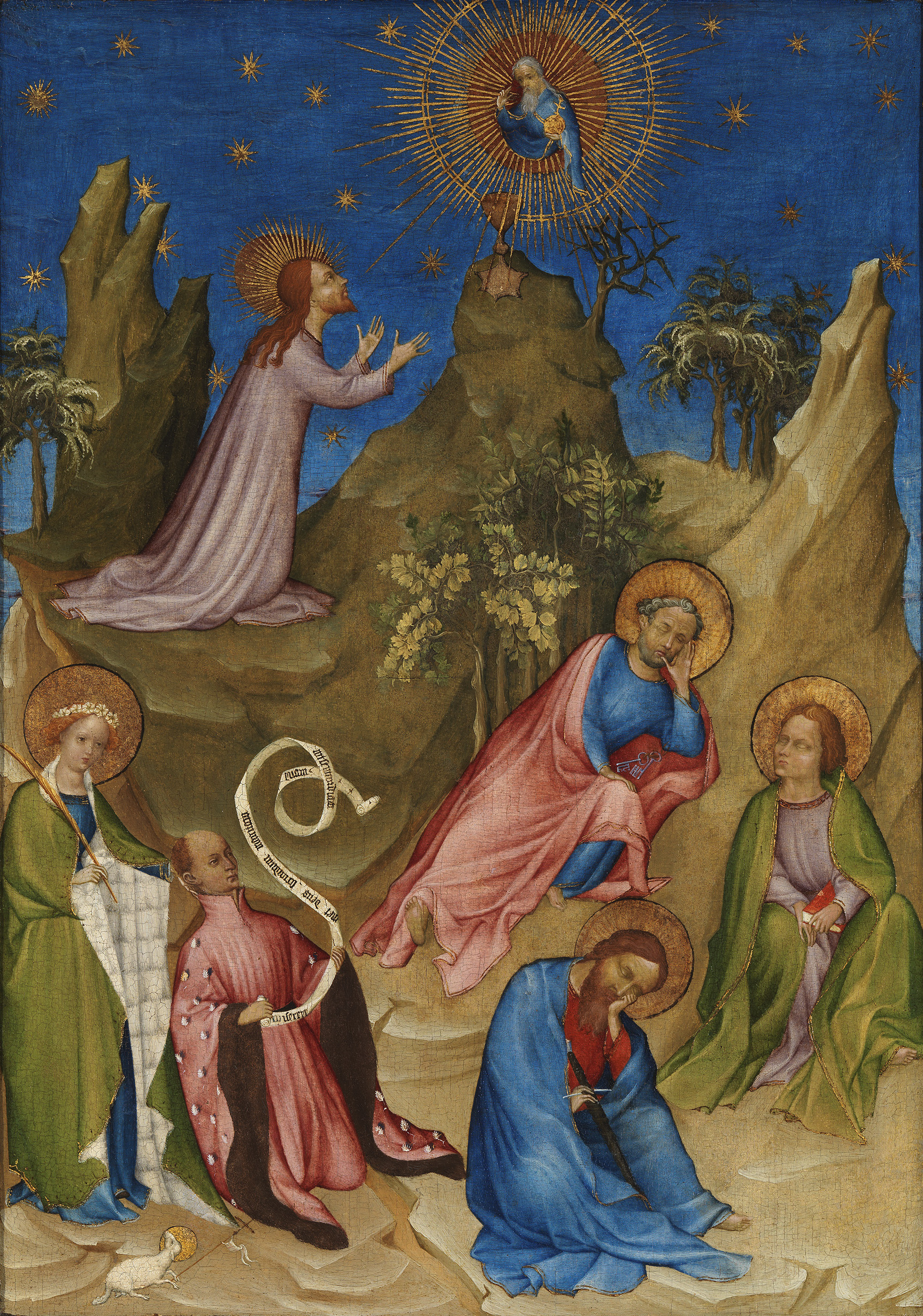
The Agony in the Garden with the Donor Louis I, Duke of Orléans, Colart de Laon, c. 1405-1408, Prado Museum

International Gothic is a period of Gothic art that began in Burgundy, France, and northern Italy in the late 14th and early 15th century. It then spread very widely across Western Europe, hence the name for the period, which was introduced by the French art historian Louis Courajod at the end of the 19th century.

The spread of ideas and portable works, such as illuminated manuscripts throughout Europe led to consensus among artists and their patrons that considerably reduced variation in national styles. The main influences were northern France, the Duchy of Burgundy, Flanders and Brabant, the Imperial court in Prague, and Italy. Royal marriages such as that between Richard II of England and Anne of Bohemia helped to spread the style.

It was initially a style of courtly sophistication, but somewhat more robust versions spread to art commissioned by the emerging mercantile classes and the smaller nobility. In Northern Europe "Late Gothic" continuations of the style, especially in its decorative elements, could still be found until the early 16th century, as no alternative decorative vocabulary emerged locally to replace it before the Renaissance revival of Classicism.

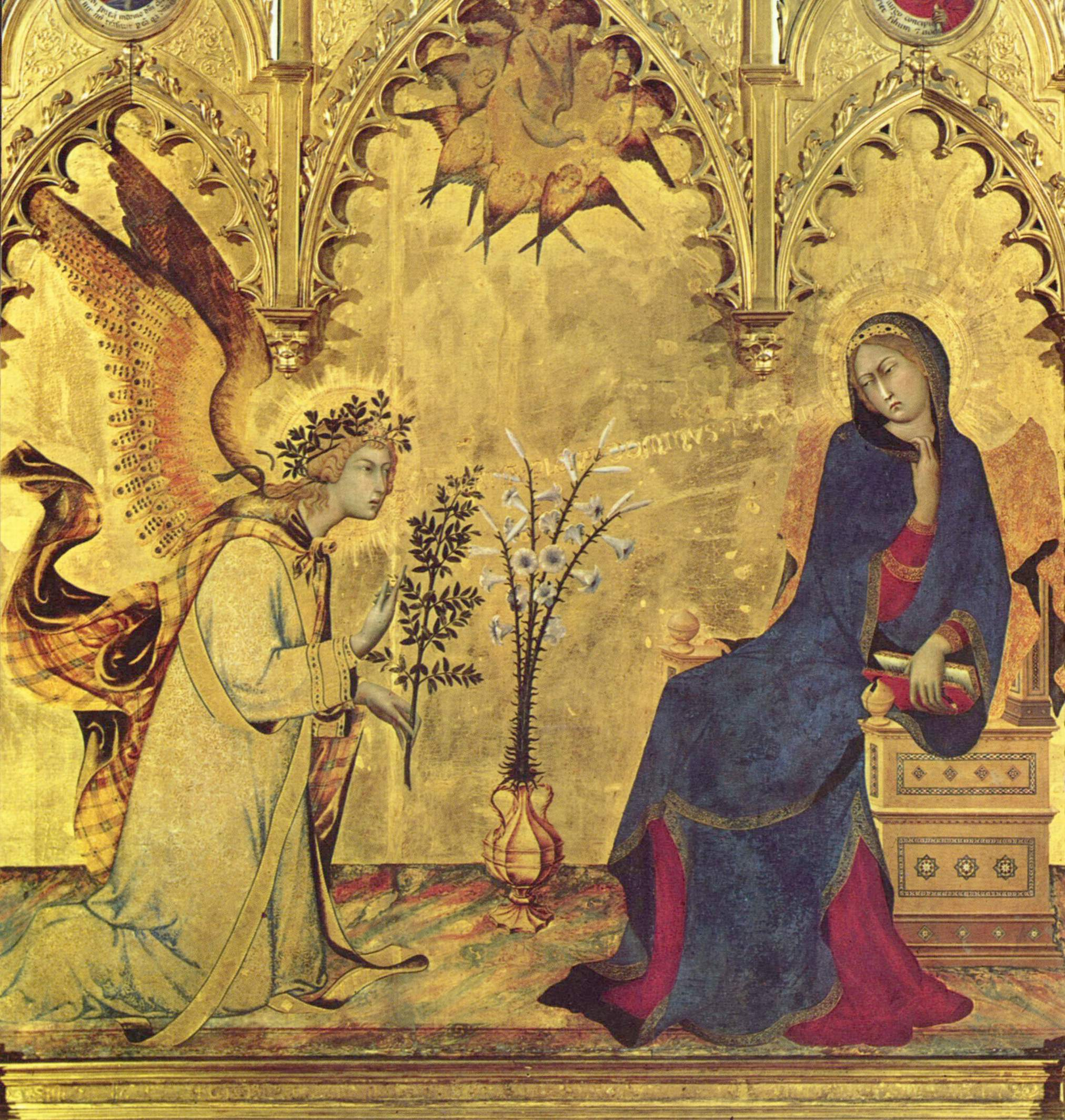
Detail of the Annunciation (1333) by the Sienese Simone Martini, Uffizi

Usage of the terms by art historians varies somewhat, with some using the term more restrictively than others. Some art historians feel the term is "in many ways ... not very helpful ... since it tends to skate over both differences and details of transmission."

== Development ==
The important Bohemian version of the style developed in the court of Charles IV, Holy Roman Emperor in Prague, which for a brief period became a leading force in the development of European art. Charles came from the Luxembourg dynasty, was tutored by the future Pope Clement VI, and as a youth spent seven years at the French court, as well as visiting Italy twice. This and family relationships gave him intimate links with the various courts of France, including that of the Avignon Papacy, and from 1363 the separate Valois Duchy of Burgundy under Philip the Bold. The Bohemian style initially lacked the elongated figures of other centres, but had a richness and sweetness in female figures that were very influential. Charles had at least one Italian altarpiece, apparently made in Italy and sent to Prague, near where it remains today in his showpiece Karlštejn Castle. For St. Vitus Cathedral in Prague, he first used a French architect, and then the German Peter Parler.

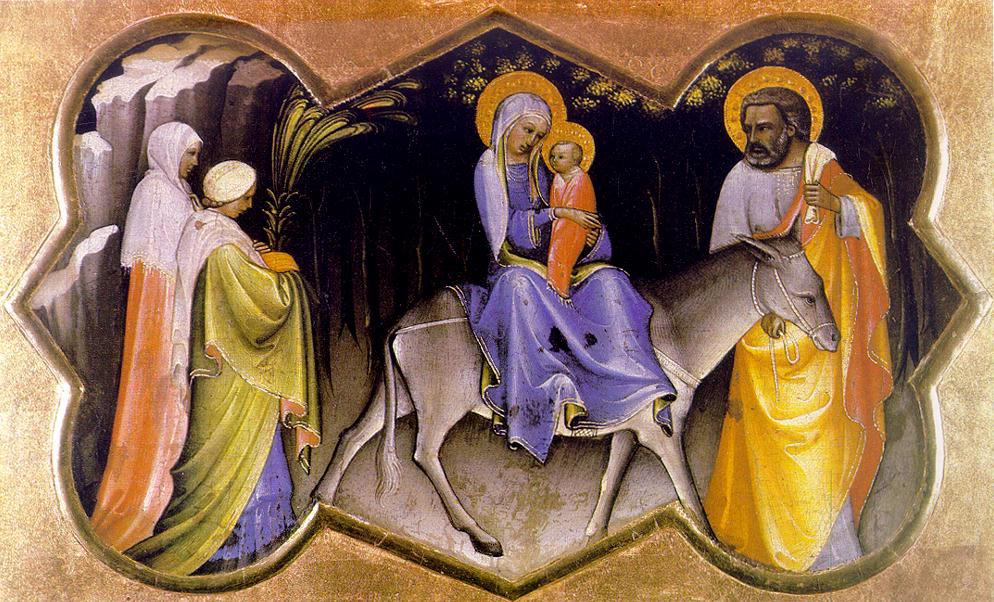
Lorenzo Monaco, The Flight into Egypt (c. 1405, predella) Tempera on poplar, 21,2 x 35,5 cm

Much of the development of the style occurred in Italy, and it probably spread north of the Alps to influence France partly through the colony of Italian artists attached to the Papal Court at Avignon, and the works displayed from the residence there in the 1330s and 1340s of Simone Martini, a Sienese precursor of the style. Republican Siena had a large influence on the development of the style, but kept to its own dignified Gothic style throughout the period, and afterwards, while the flamboyant Visconti court at Milan, also closely related to the French royal family, was the most important Italian centre of the courtly style. As the style developed in Northern Europe, Italian artists were in turn influenced by it.

The marriage in 1384 between the young King Richard II of England and Charles IV's daughter Anne of Bohemia helped to connect Prague and London, and bring the style to England, although Anne died in 1394.

== Royal portraits ==
A number of central works of International Gothic work are votive portraits of monarchs with a sacred figure – in some cases being received into Heaven by them, as with a miniature of Jean, Duc de Berry, and some of his relatives, being welcomed by Saint Peter in the Très Riches Heures du Duc de Berry. From this period come the earliest surviving panel portraits of monarchs, and royal manuscripts show a greatly increased number of realistic portraits of the monarch who commissioned them.

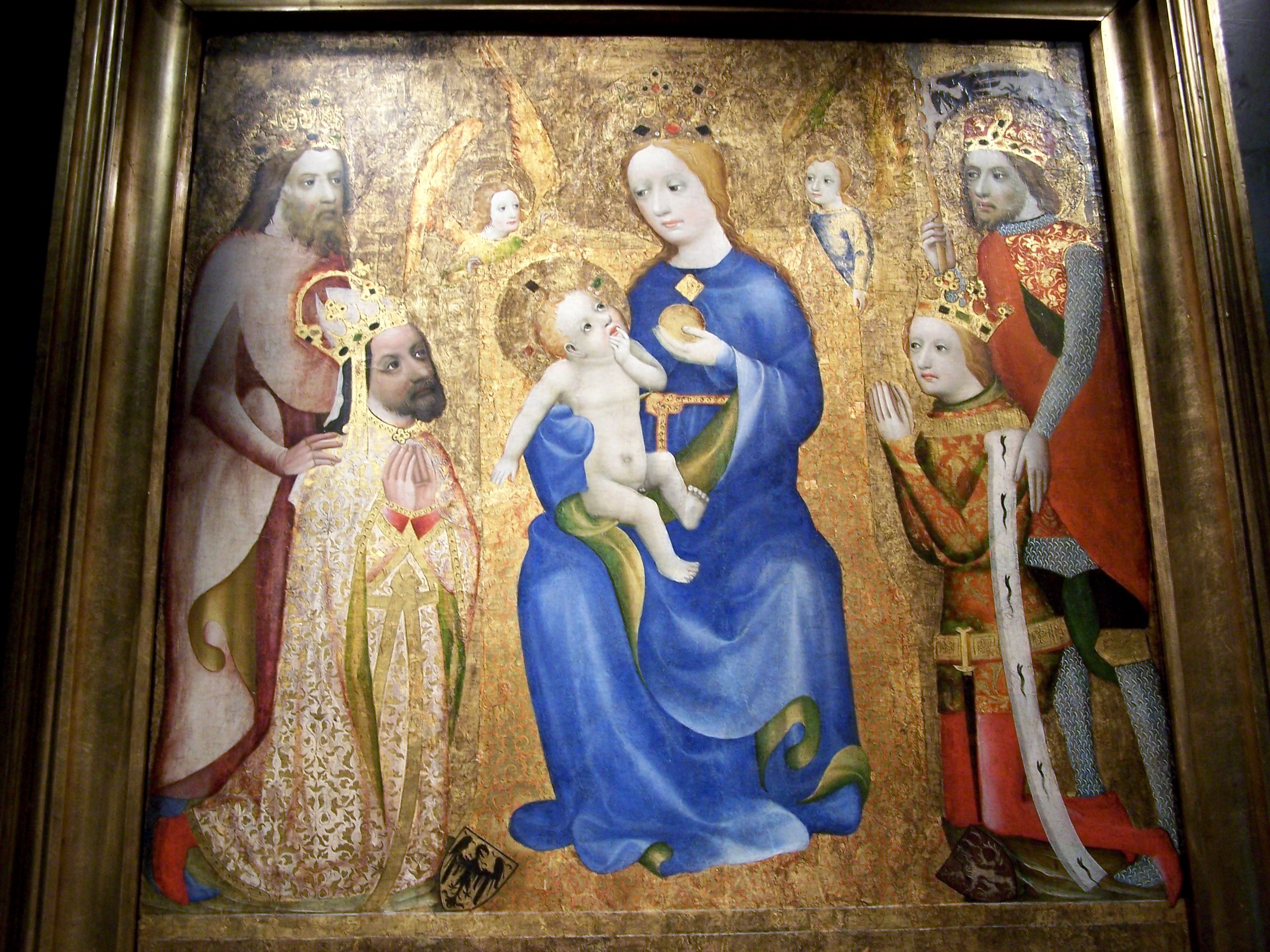
The Votive Panel of Jan Očko of Vlašim. Kneeling Emperor Charles IV and his son Wenceslaus before the Virgin, Bohemia, 1371. (Detail)

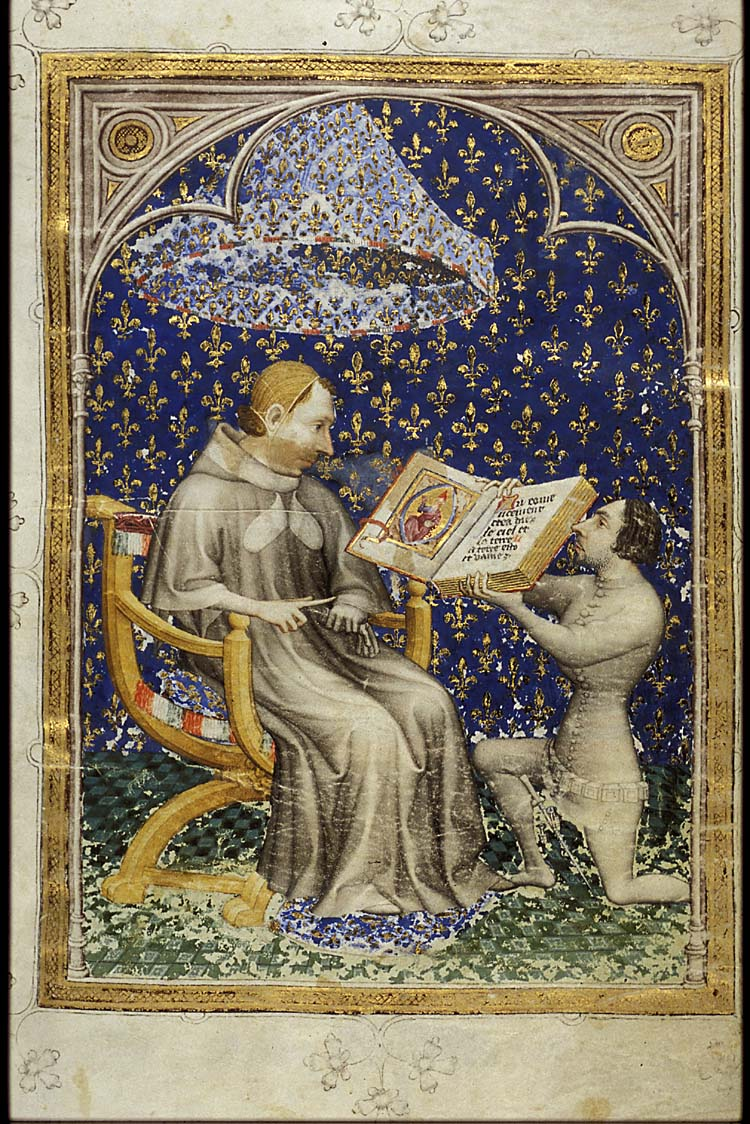
Jean de Vaudetar, chamberlain of king Charles V of France, presents his gift of a manuscript to the King, 1372.

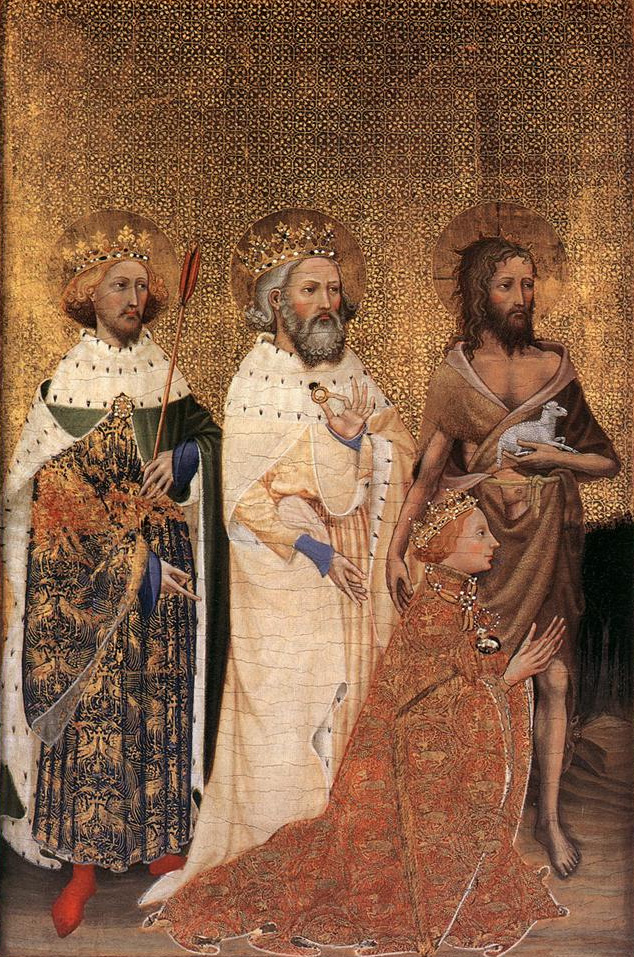
The Wilton Diptych 1395–99. King Richard II of England kneels. (left side of the diptych)

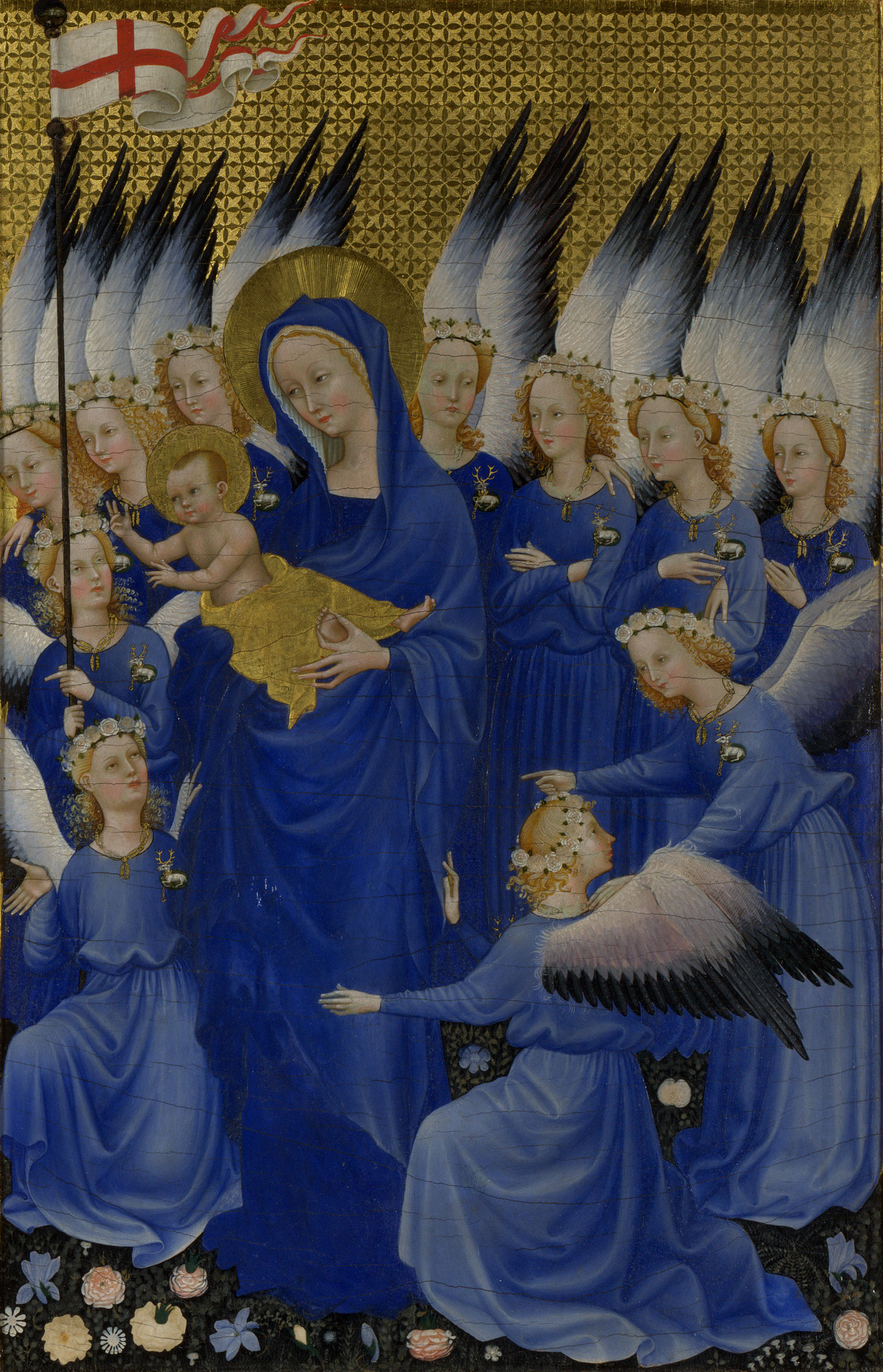
The Wilton Diptych, painted in England by a French or English artist. (right side)

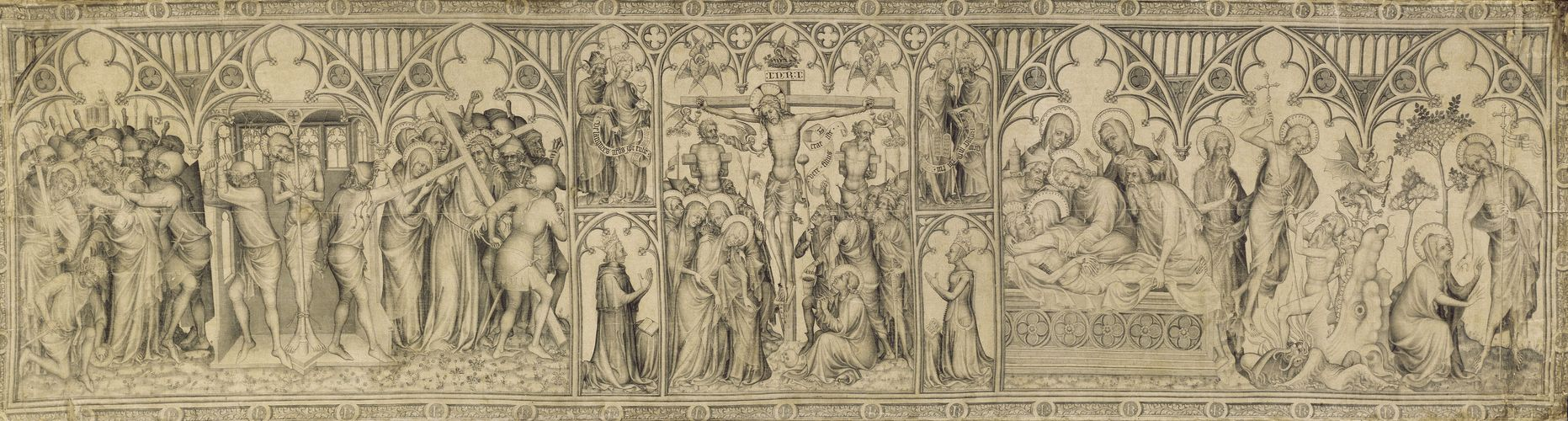
The Parement of Narbonne by the French Master of the Parement, 1364–78, a painted silk altar frontal with donor portraits of the King and Queen

== Survey ==
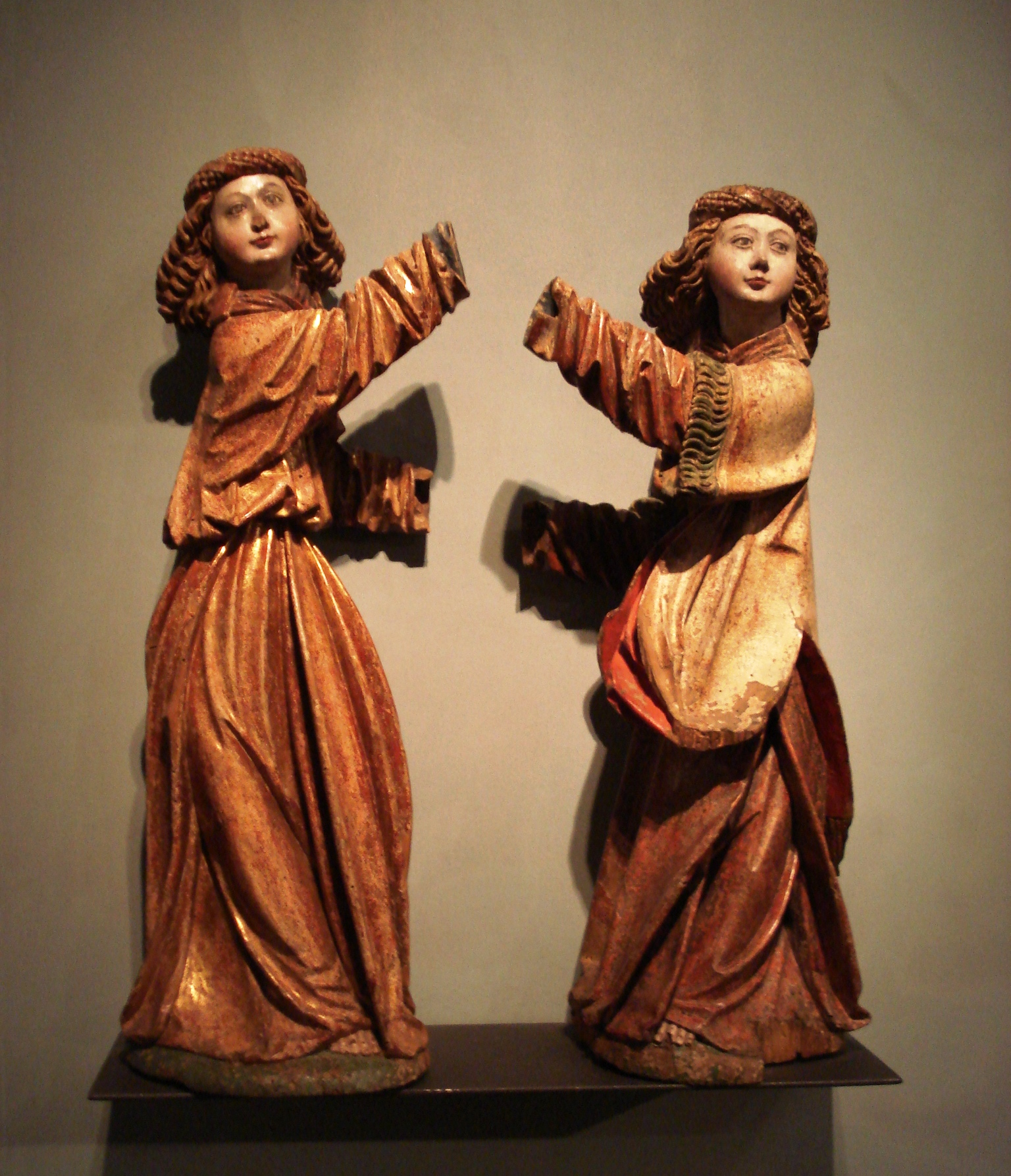
Two angels from Bohemia

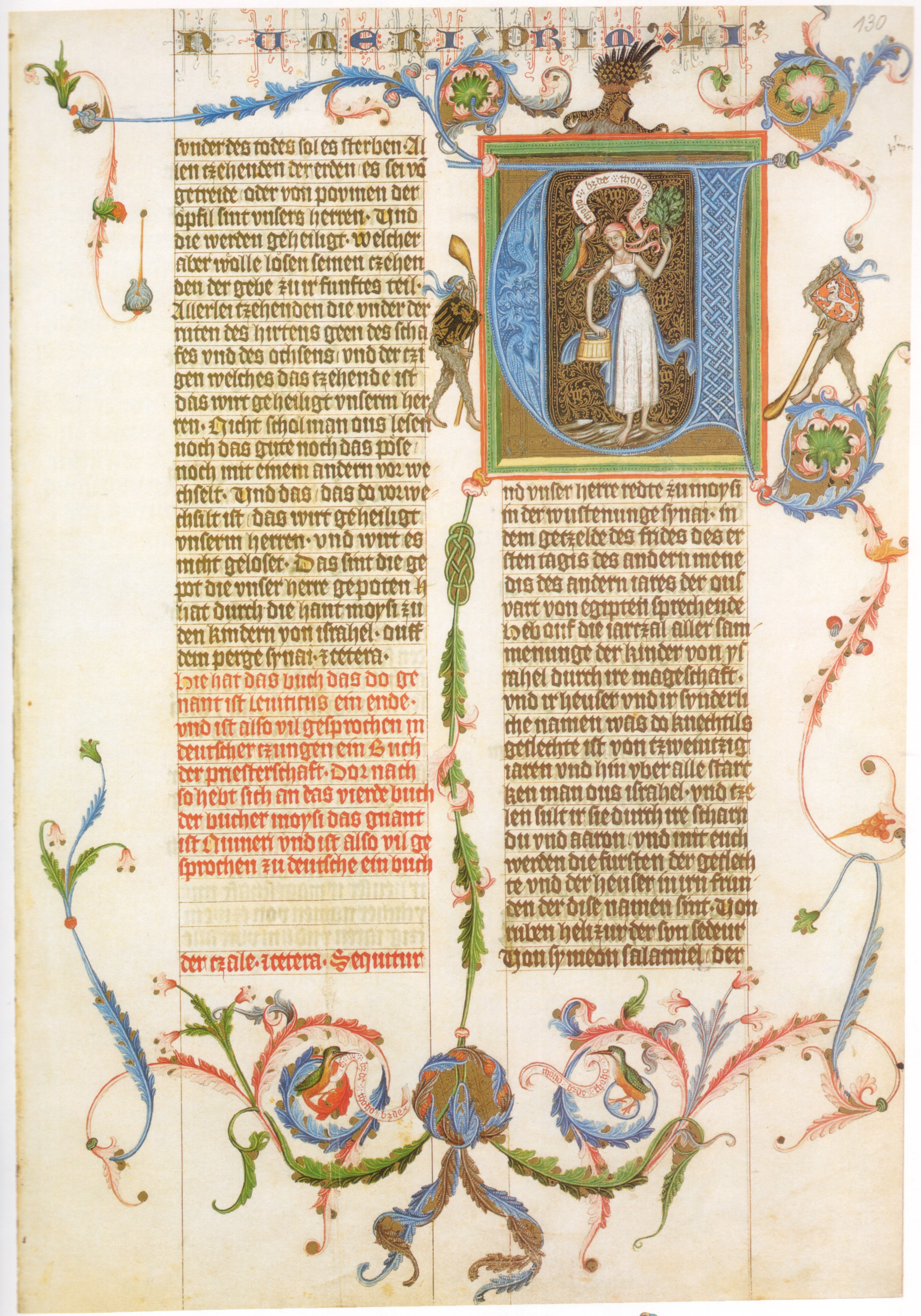
A page from the luxury illuminated manuscript Wenceslas Bible, a German translation of the 1390s

=== Painting and sculpture ===
In painting and sculpture, the style is sometimes known in German as the "Schöne Stil" or "Weicher Stil" ("Beautiful style" or "Soft style"). Stylistic features are a dignified elegance, which replaces monumentality, along with rich decorative colouring, elongated figures and flowing lines. It also makes a more practised use of perspective, modelling, and setting. Figures begin to be given more space in their settings, and interest is taken in realistically depicted plants and animals. In some works, above all the famous calendar scenes of the Très Riches Heures du Duc de Berry, the beginnings of real landscape painting are seen. Decoration became increasingly ornate as the style developed in Northern Europe, whereas in Italy the increased sophistication of figure painting was absorbed into Early Renaissance painting.

In sculpture the leading Italian artists remained closer to classicism, and were less affected by the movement; Lorenzo Ghiberti is in many respects close to the style, but already seems infused with Early Renaissance classicism. Claus Sluter was the leading sculptor in Burgundy, and was one artist able to use the style with a strongly monumental effect. Most sculptors are unknown, and the style tended to survive longer in Northern sculpture than painting, as the detailed realism of Early Netherlandish painting was harder to translate into sculpture. Smaller painted wood figures, most often of the Madonna, were significant, and being relatively portable, probably helped to disseminate the style across Europe.

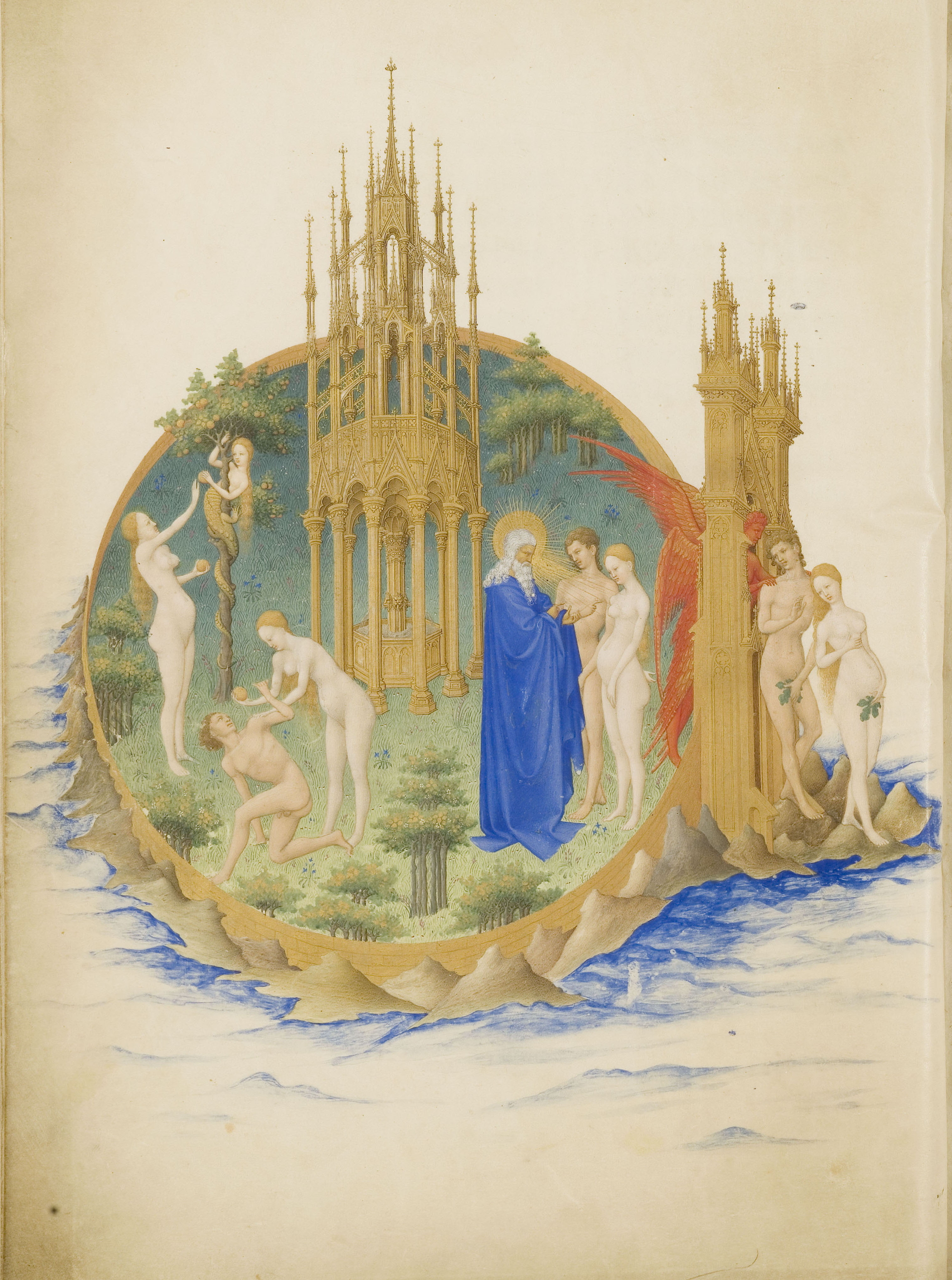
The Garden of Eden from the Très Riches Heures du Duc de Berry by the Limbourg Brothers, 1410s

Notable painters included Master Theoderic and the Master of the Třeboň Altarpiece in Bohemia, the Master of the Parement, Jacquemart de Hesdin and the Netherlandish Limbourg brothers in France, and Gentile da Fabriano, Lorenzo Monaco and Pisanello in Italy, the last taking the style into the Early Renaissance. In Burgundy Jean Malouel, Melchior Broederlam and Henri Bellechose were succeeded by Robert Campin and Jan van Eyck who took Early Netherlandish painting in the direction of greater illusionism. Master Bertram and Conrad von Soest were leading regional masters in Germany, working largely for city burghers. Surviving panel paintings of the best quality from before 1390 are very rare except from Italy and the Prague court. Many of these artists moved between countries or regions during their careers, exposing them to the styles of other centres. In particular Broederlam had spent some years in Italy, and it has been speculated that the Master of the Parement was himself Bohemian, as his known French works are very few, and extremely close to Bohemian art.

Illuminated manuscripts remained important vehicles of the style, and in works like the Sherborne Missal were the main English contribution, apart from the stained glass of John Thornton in York Minster and of Thomas Glazier in Oxford and elsewhere. Nottingham alabaster carvings, produced in considerable quantities by workshops to standard patterns, were exported all over Western Europe to value-conscious parish churches. The Hours of Gian Galeazzo Visconti from Milan was a key work, as was the Wenceslas Bible (with the text in German) of Charles IV's son. Both, like the Sherborne Missal, are marked by extravagantly decorated borders. John, Duke of Berry, son and brother of French kings, was the most extravagant commissioner of manuscripts, and the main employer of the Limbourg Brothers, the Master of the Brussels Initials and Jacquemart de Hesdin, as well as using many other artists. Other large-scale collectors included Wenceslas, the son of Charles IV, John of Lancaster, 1st Duke of Bedford, son of Henry IV of England and "Regent" of English-occupied France, and the Dukes of Burgundy. In the fifteenth century the cities of Flanders, especially Bruges, came to outstrip Paris as a centre of both manuscript illumination and panel painting.

=== Tapestry ===
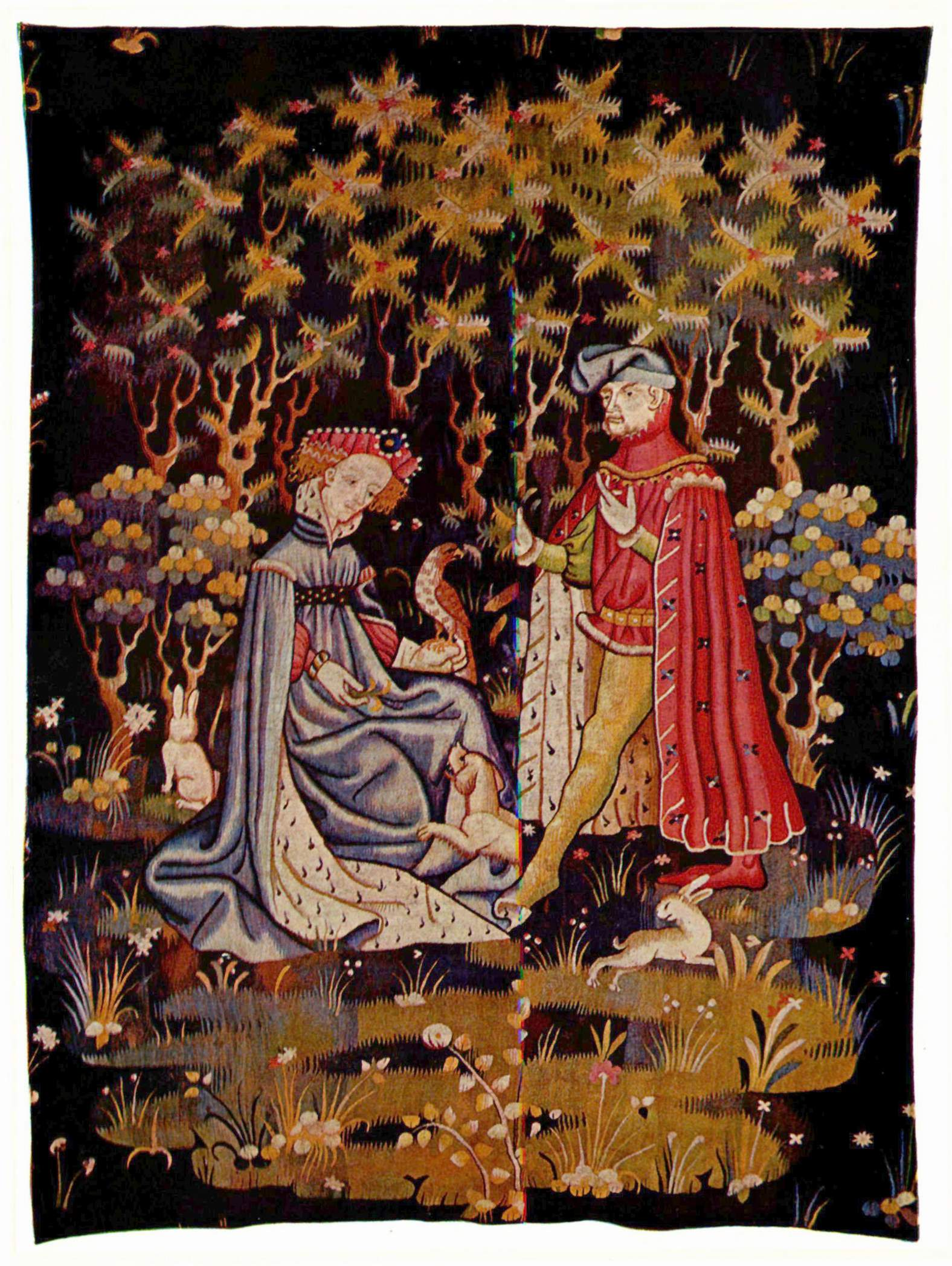
Arras tapestry of about 1410 (the dog and rabbits signify lust)

A further vehicle of the International Gothic style was provided by the tapestry-weaving centers of Arras, Tournai and Paris, where tapestry production was permanently disordered by the English occupation of 1418–36. Under the consistent patronage of the Dukes of Burgundy, their courtly International Gothic style, elongated figures, rich details of attire, crowded composition, with figures disposed in tiers, owe their inspiration to manuscript illuminators and directly to painters: Baudouin de Bailleul, a painter established at Arras, supplied cartoons for tapestry workshops there and at Tournai, where elements of a local style are hard to distinguish (Weigert, p. 44). The Chatsworth Hunts (Victoria and Albert Museum) are inspired by Gaston de Foix's book on hunting and the many weavings of Trojan War cycles by contemporary romances.

Tapestry too was an art that was portable. Suites accompanied their seigneurial owners from one unheated and empty château to another. Tapestry weavers themselves could be induced to move workshops, though they remained tied to the accessibility of English wool. Religious and secular subjects vied in this essentially secular art.

A medium of Late Gothic style that is easily overlooked because it has virtually entirely disappeared is that of painted hangings, which served as a less expensive substitute for woven hangings but could be produced, with appropriate themes, on short notice.

== Peak of the movement ==
In a period lasting approximately between 1390 and 1420 there was a particularly close correspondence between works produced far apart in Europe. In the north the miniatures of the Très Riches Heures Limbourg brothers, in Italy the Adoration of the Magi of Lorenzo Monaco, and sculpture and miniatures in many countries show very stylised tall figures, the older men with imposingly long beards and swaying figures. Exotic clothes, based loosely on those of the contemporary Middle East or Byzantine Empire, are worn by figures in biblical scenes; many figures seem to be included just to show off these costumes. The number of figures in many standard religious scenes is greatly increased; the Magi have large retinues, and the Crucifixion often becomes a crowded event. This innovation was to survive the style itself.

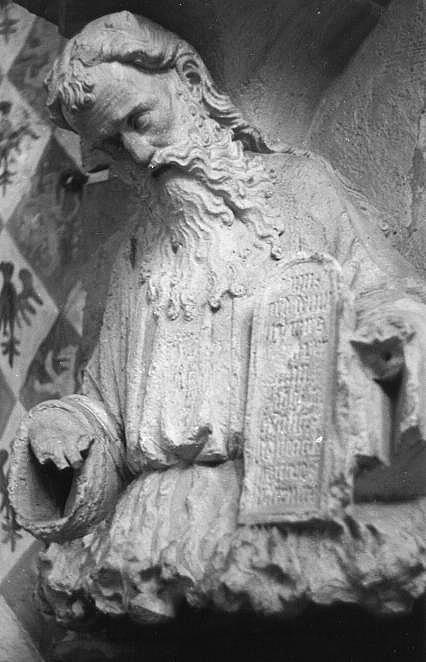
Statue of Moses, c. 1390, Toruń, Poland

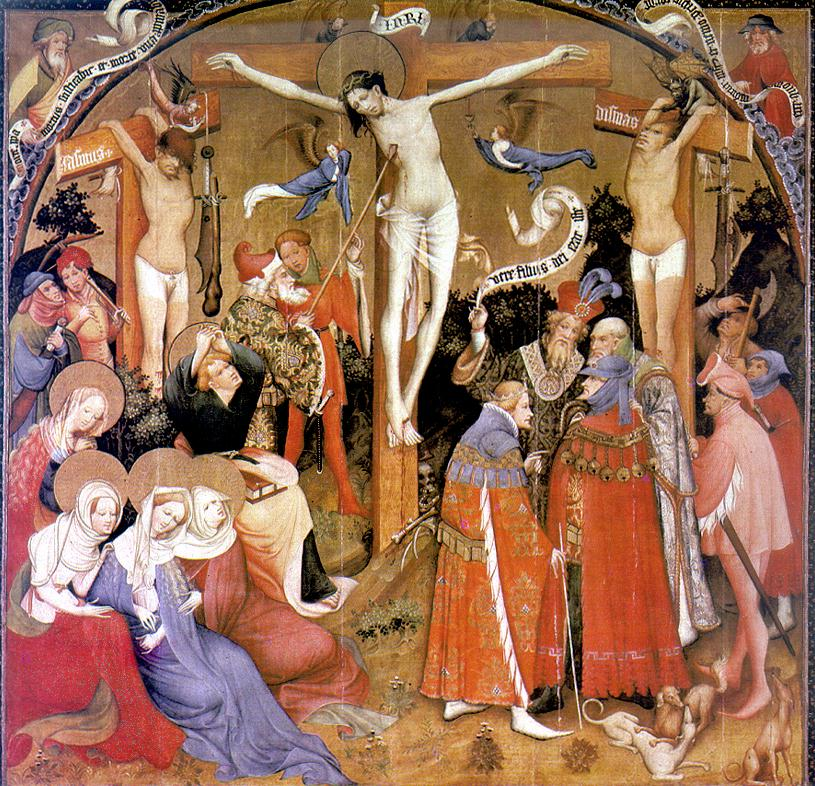
Conrad von Soest, based in Dortmund Germany, Crucifixion, 1403

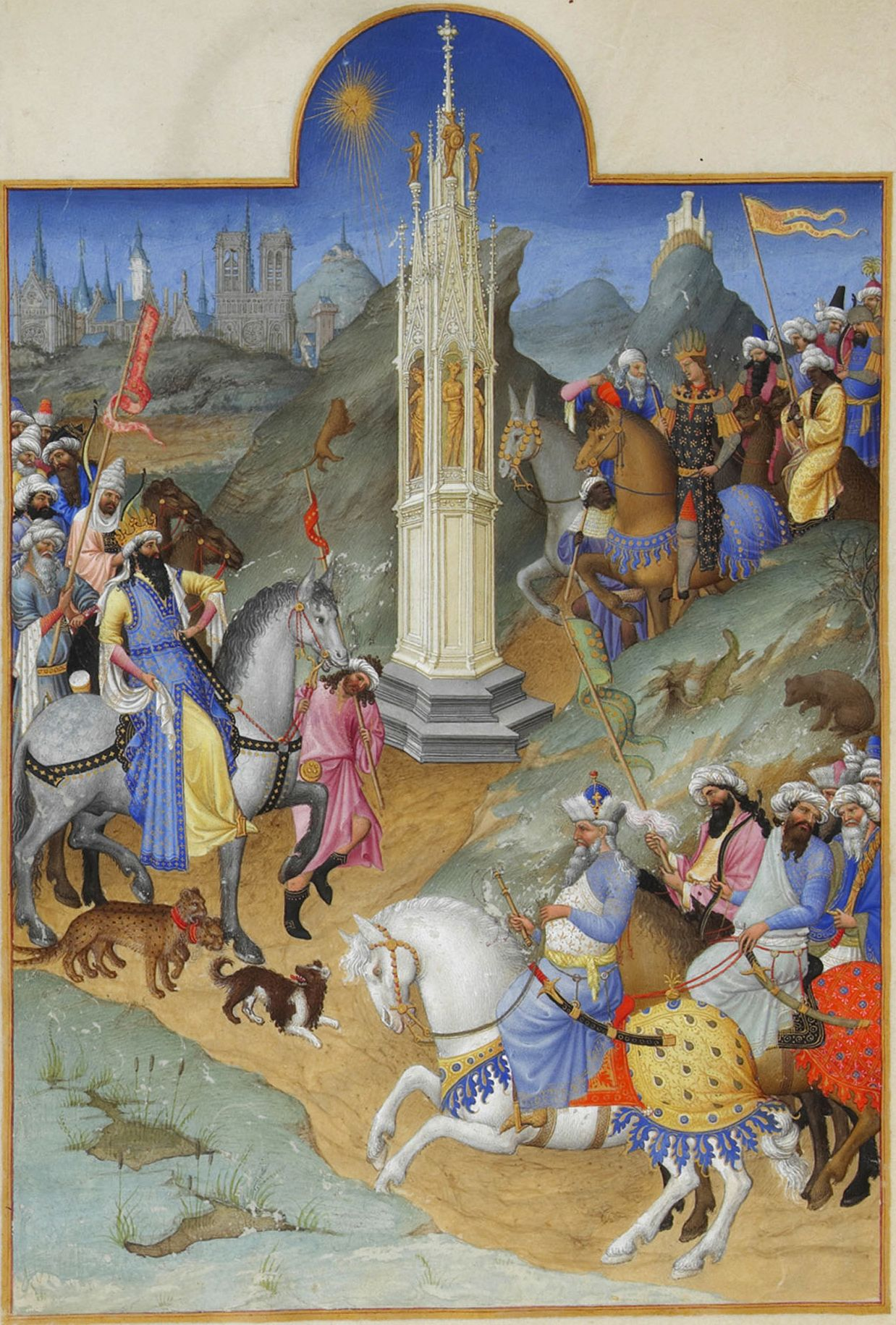
The Meeting of the Magi from the Très Riches Heures by the Limbourg brothers, from the Northern Netherlands but working in France

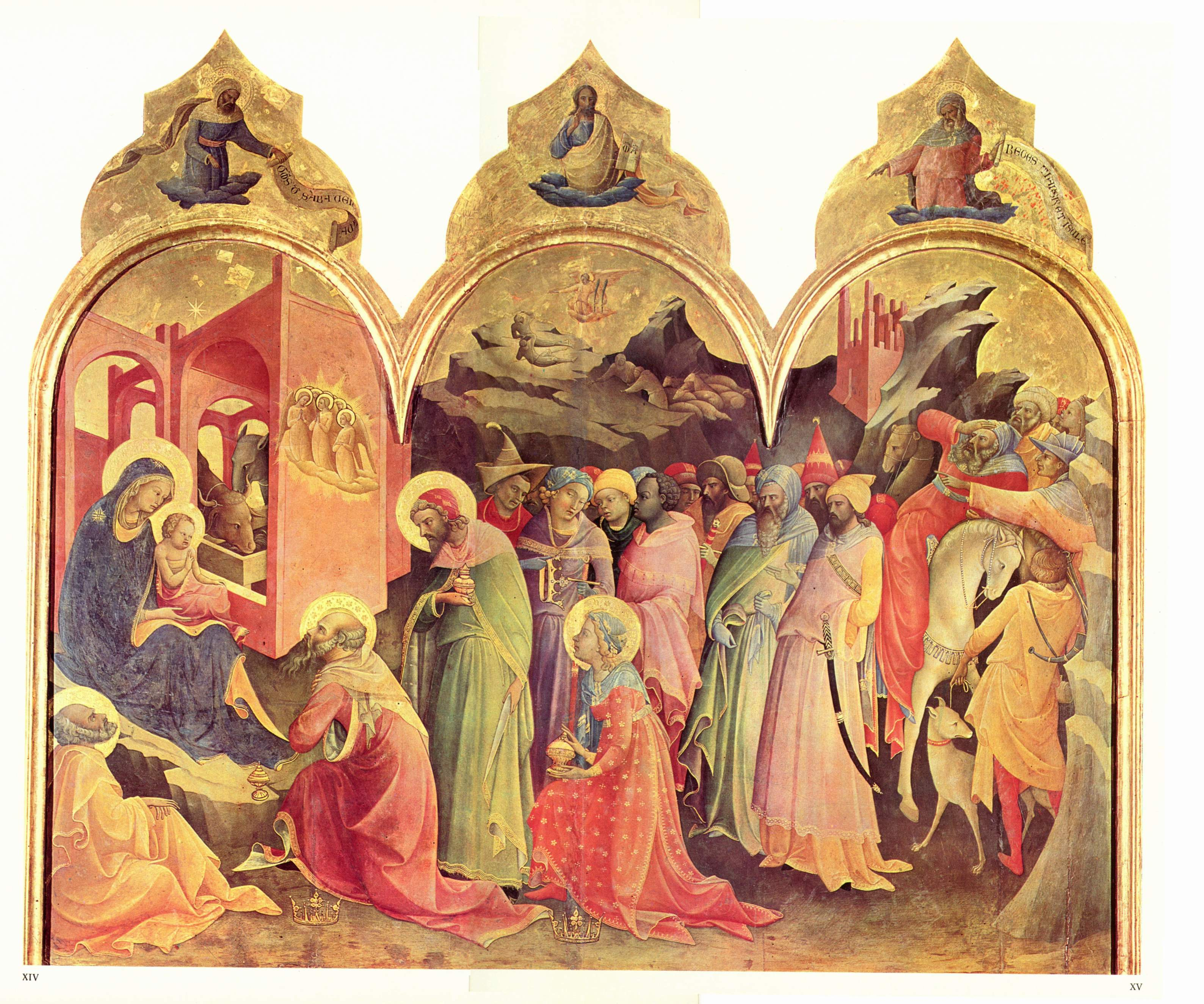
Lorenzo Monaco, Adoration of the Magi, 1420–22

== Ending of the International moment ==
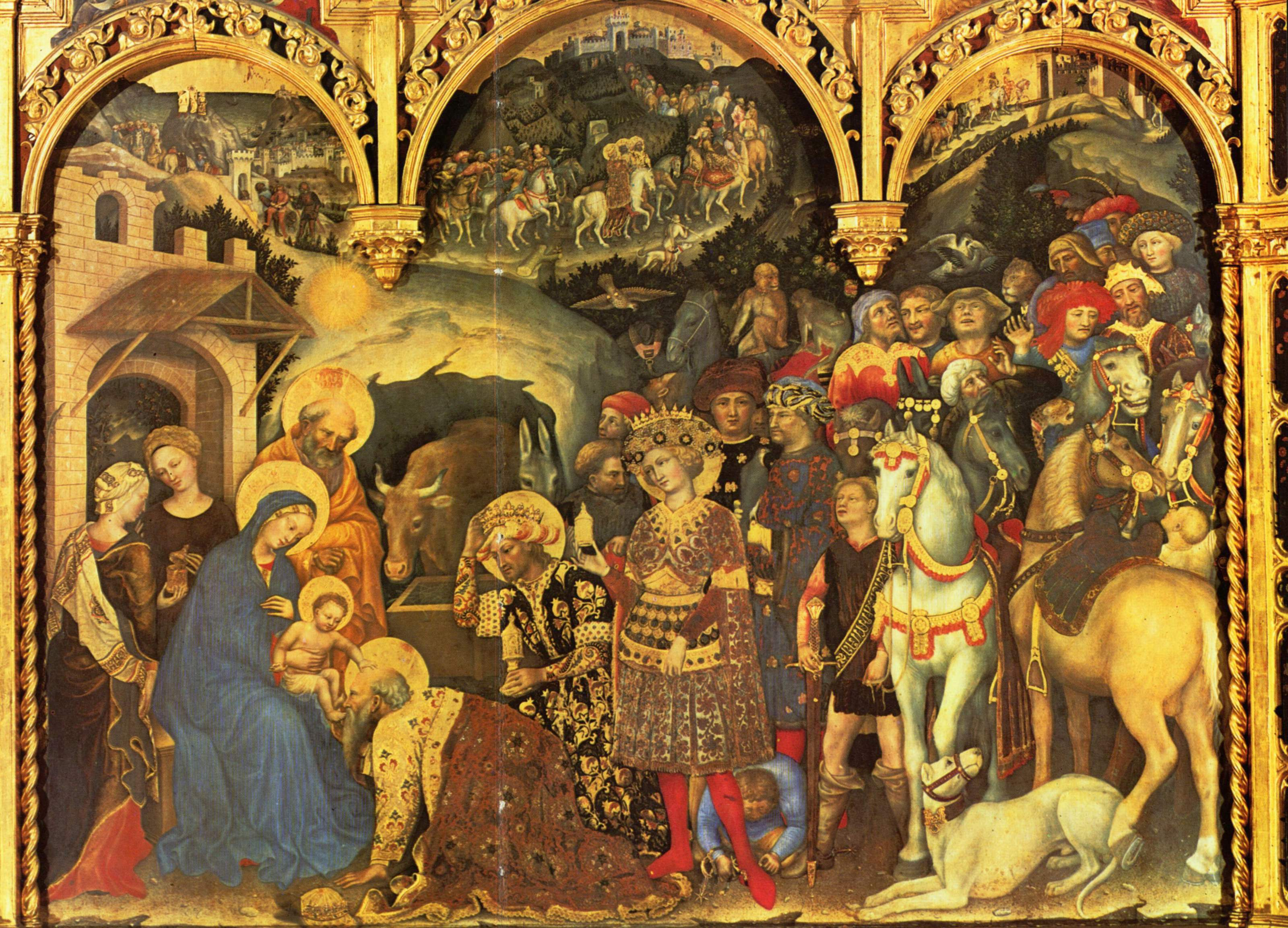
Gentile da Fabriano's Adoration of the Magi (1423–5). Tempera on wood, 300 x 282 cm.

The unveiling of Gentile da Fabriano's Adoration of the Magi (below) in Florence in 1423, "the culminating work of International Gothic painting", was almost immediately followed by the painting of the Brancacci Chapel by Masolino and Masaccio (1424–26), which was recognised as a breakthrough to a new style. In similar fashion the Limbourg brothers' masterpiece the Très Riches Heures du Duc de Berry was followed within a few years by the Turin-Milan Hours, a continuation of a manuscript started decades before by the Parement Master for the Duke of Berry, which despite a Gothic framework pioneered a very different style of painting.

But outside Florence and the leading courts the International Gothic still held sway, gradually developing in directions that once again diverged considerably between Italy and Europe north of the Alps. The arts and architecture transitioned into the Early Renaissance.

== Gallery ==
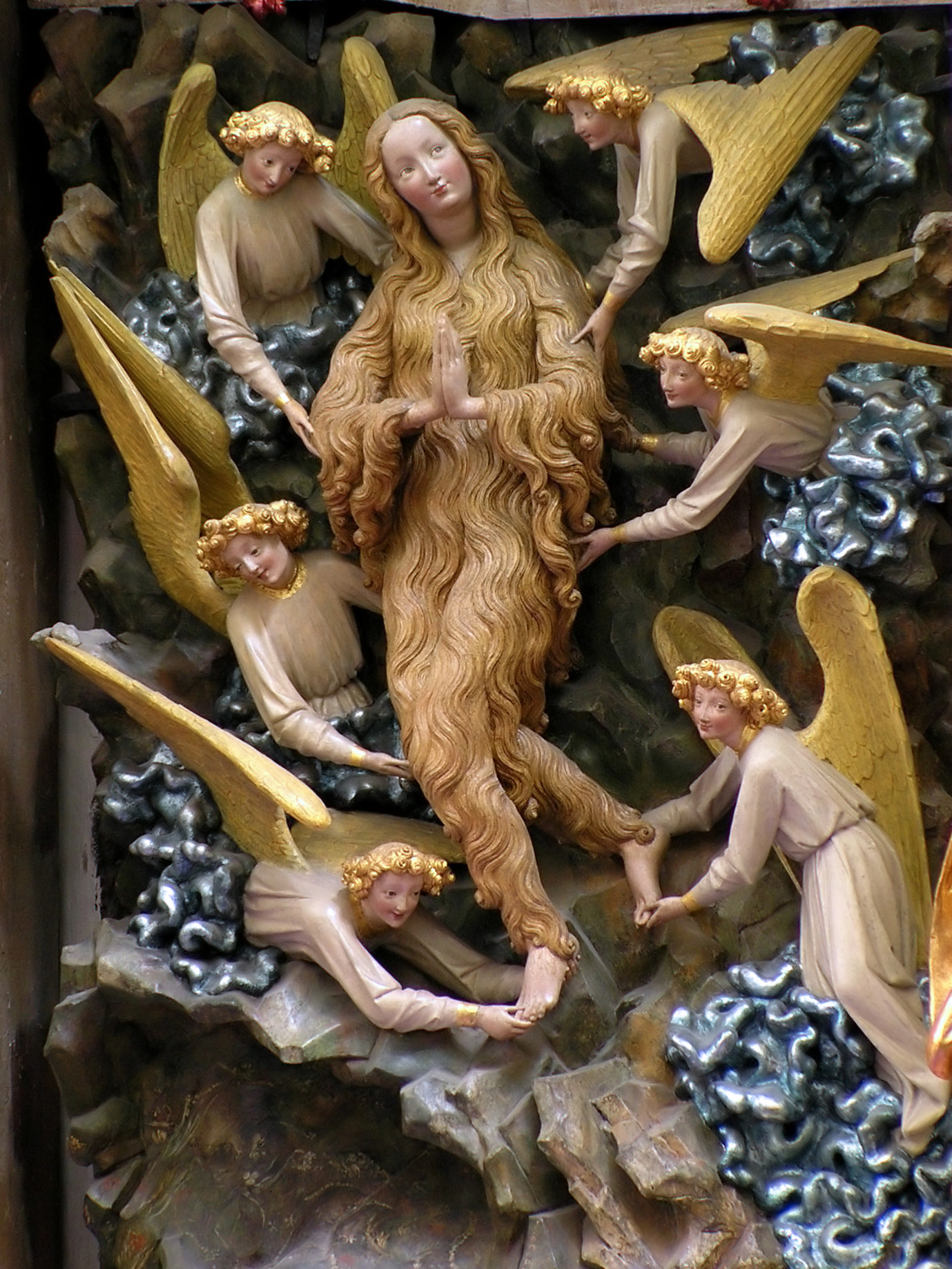
Mary Magdalen and angels, end 14th century (?), from the Hanseatic city of Toruń in Poland

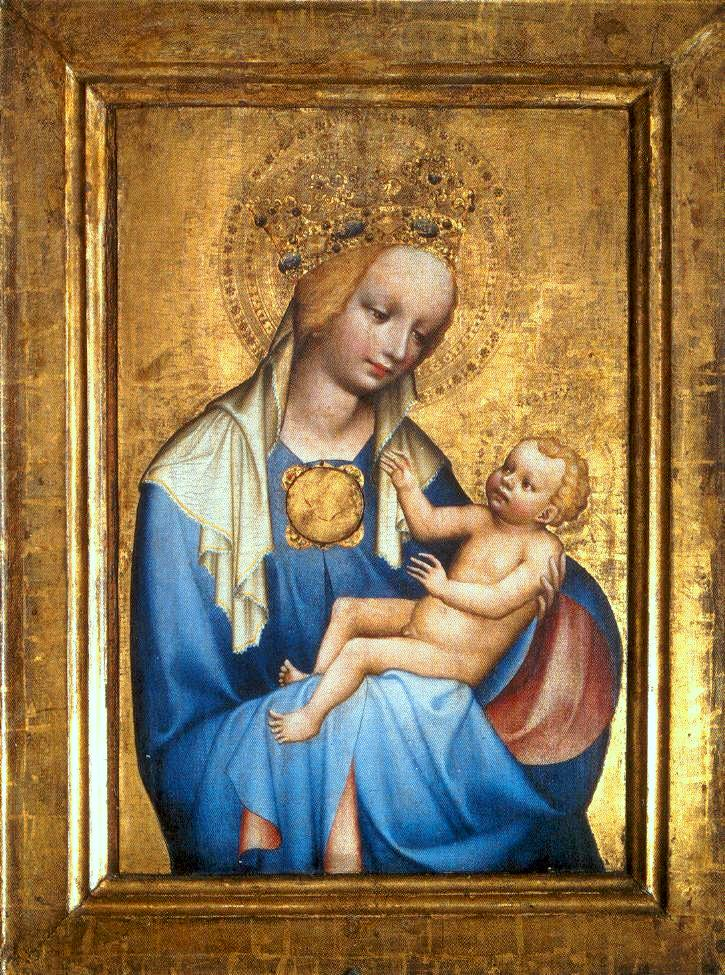
Roudnice Madonna, c. 1385–90, Master of the Třeboň Altarpiece, Bohemia

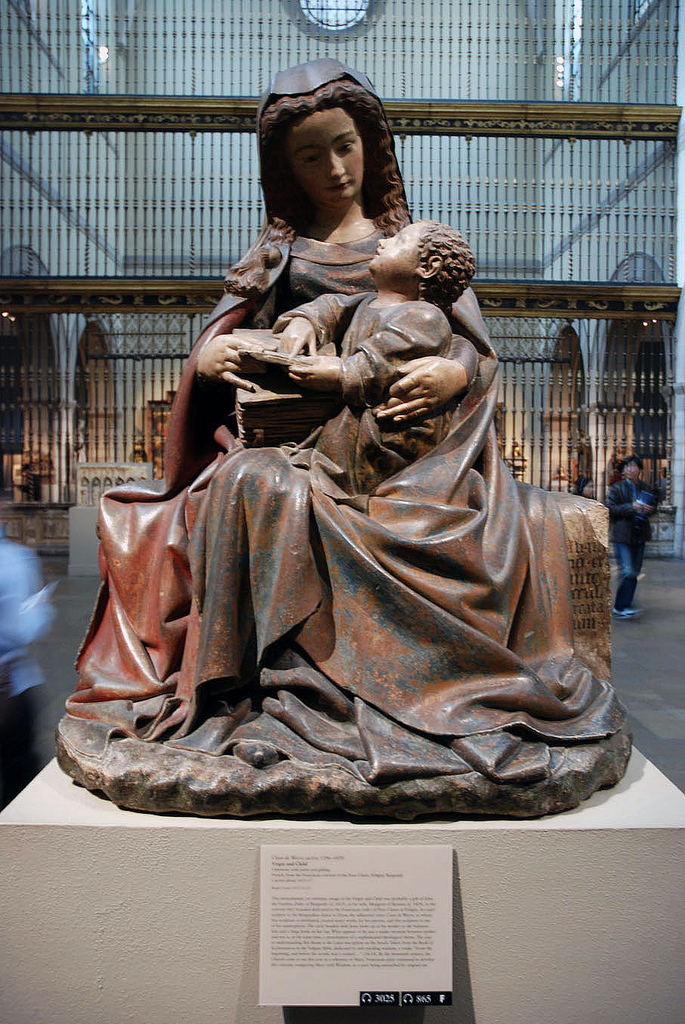
The Virgin and the Child of Poligny by the Dutch sculptor Claus de Werve, 1396–c. 1439

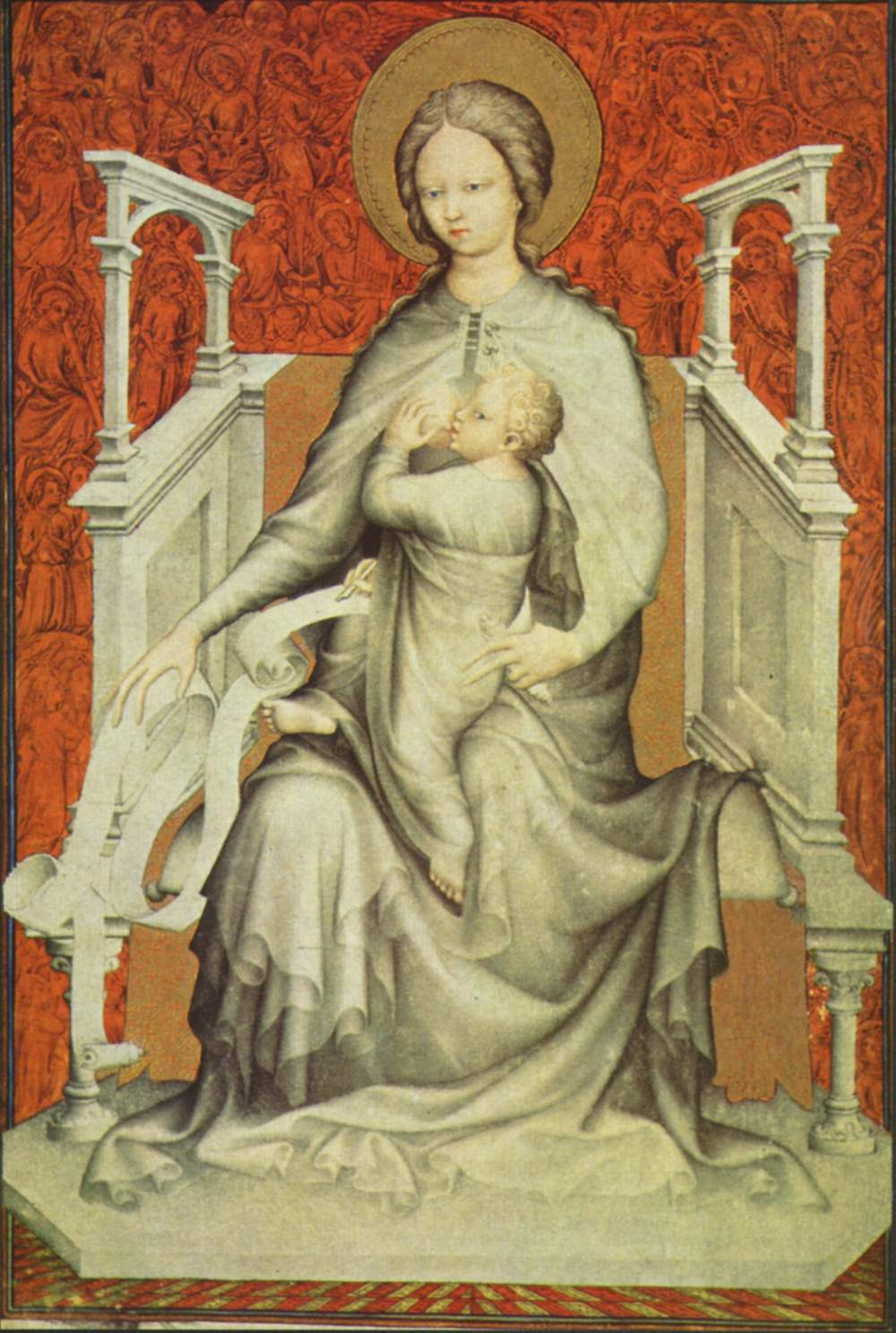
Madonna by André Beauneveu from one of the Duke of Berry's manuscripts, with a richly populated grisaille background, c. 1402

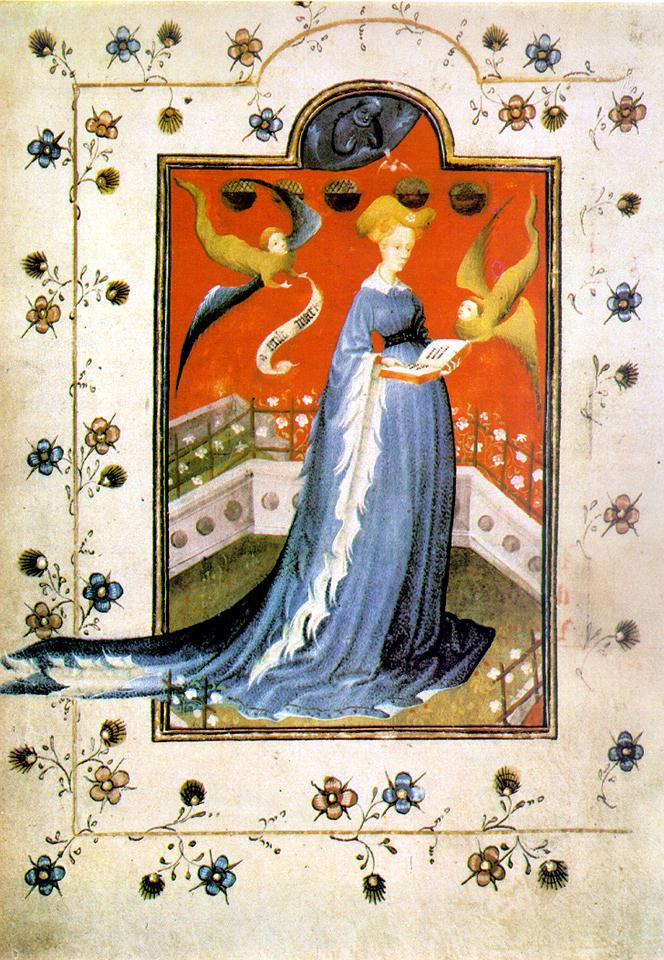
Mary of Guelders (the wife of Reinoud IV) depicted as the Virgin Mary, Dutch, 1415

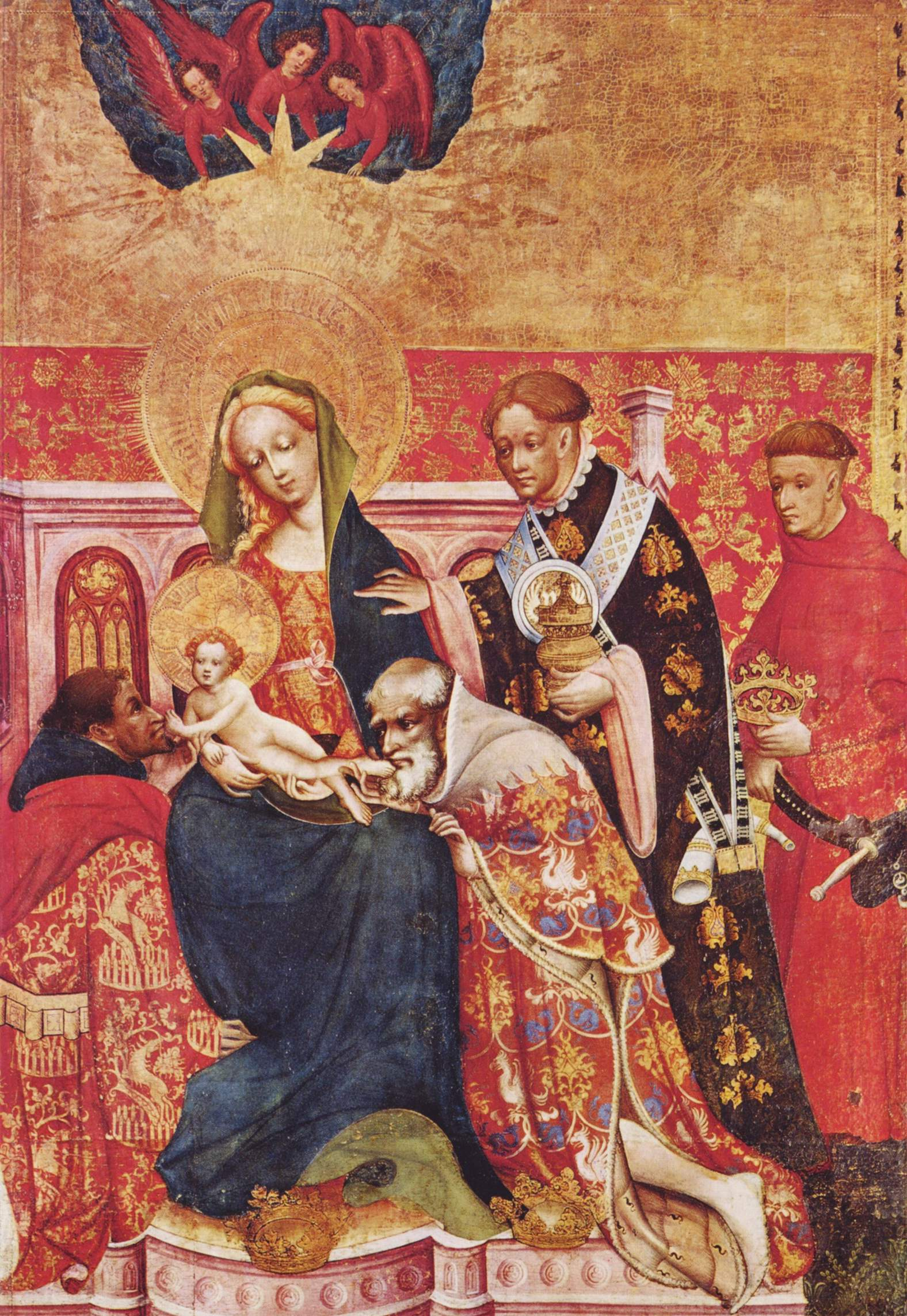
Adoration of the Magi by Conrad von Soest, German, c. 1420

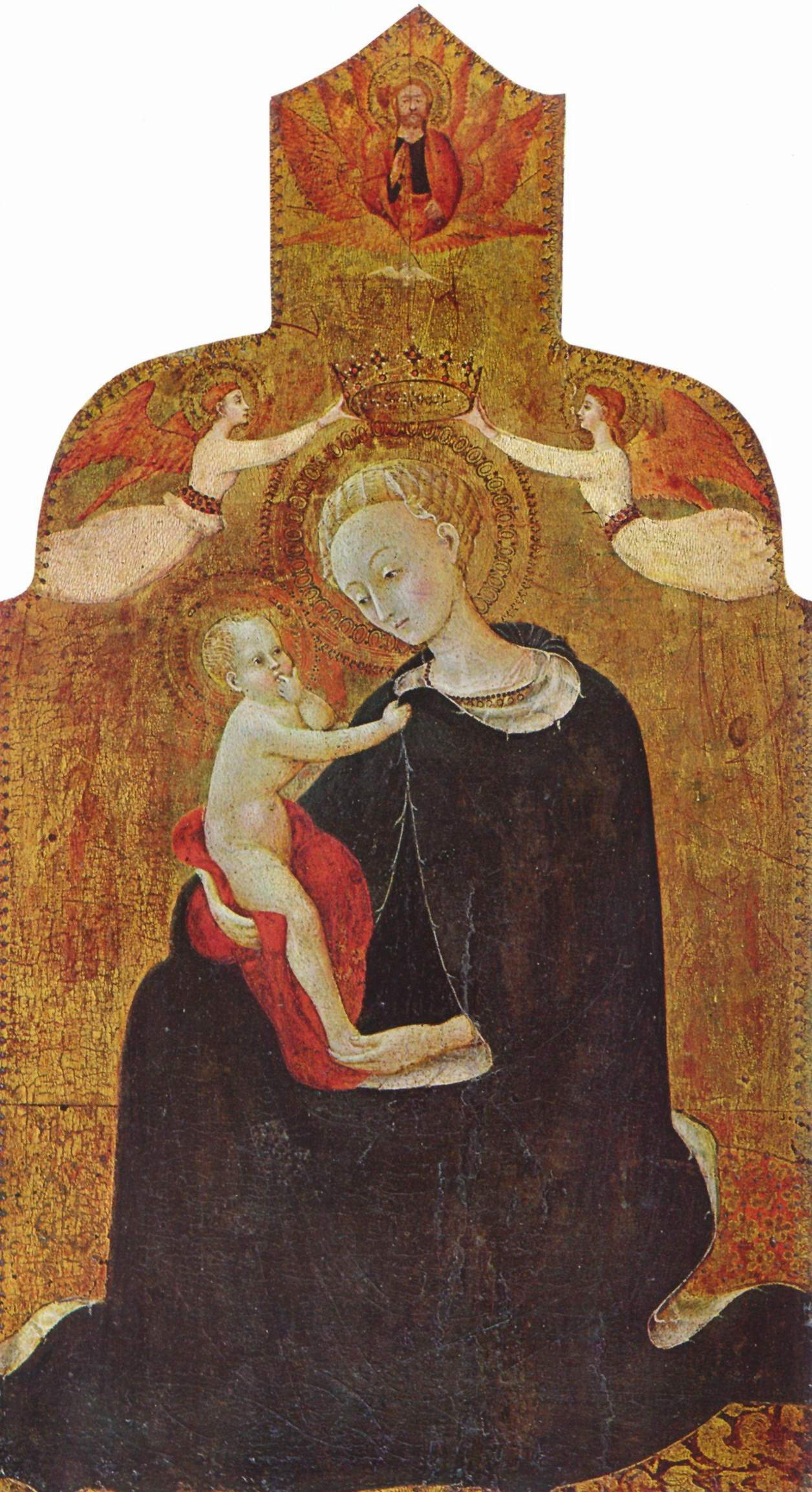
Madonna by Sassetta, a late representative of the distinctive Siennese style, 1432–36

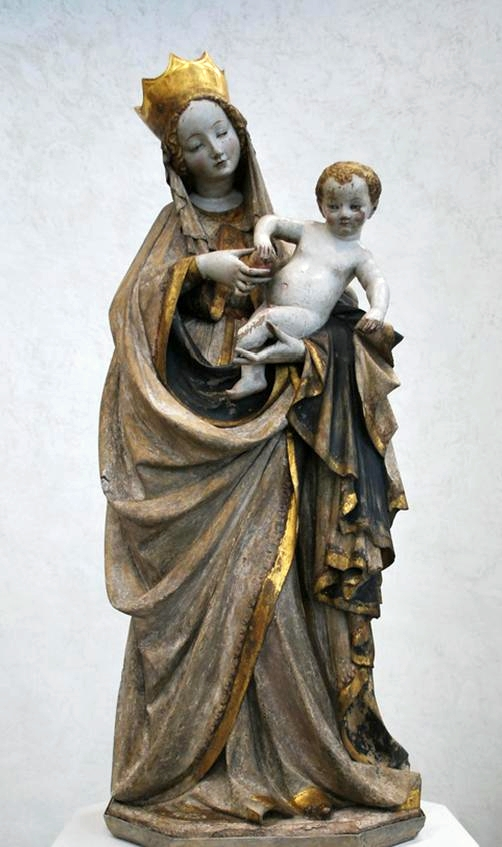
Beautiful Madonna from Wrocław, National Museum in Warsaw

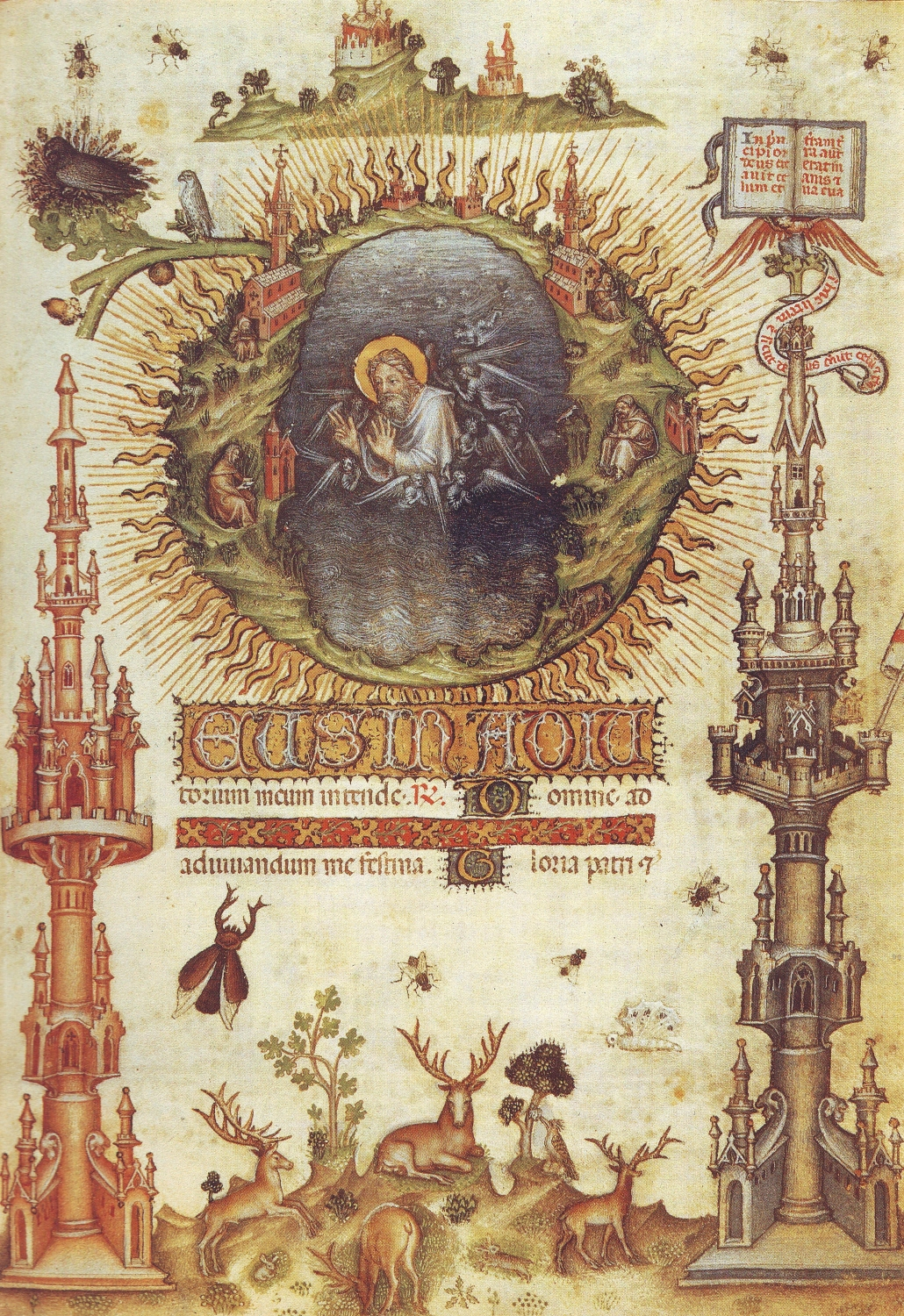
Page from the Hours of Gian Galeazzo Visconti, Milan

== See also ==
- International Gothic art in Italy
- Madonna of Nesvačily
