= Belles Heures du Duc de Berry =

Illuminated manuscript book of hours of 1409

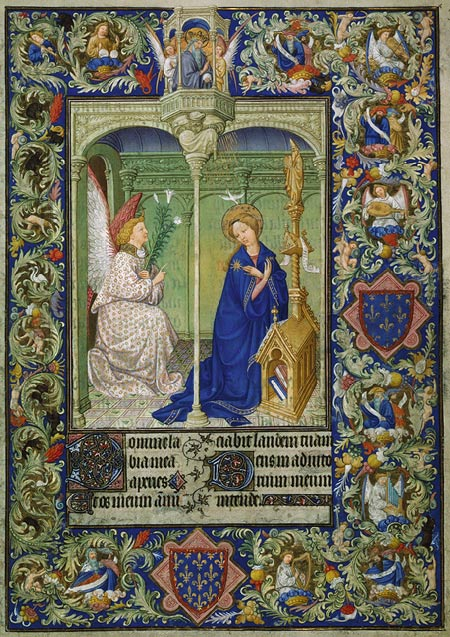
Illuminated manuscript page illustrating the Annunciation from the Belles Heures du Duc de Berry.

The Belles Heures du Duc de Berry (Beautiful Hours of the Duke of Berry) is an early 15th-century illuminated book of hours (containing prayers to be said by the faithful at each canonical hour of the day) commissioned by the French prince John, Duke of Berry (French: Jean, duc de Berry), around 1409, and made for his use in private prayer and especially devotions to the Virgin Mary. The miniatures of the Belles Heures are mostly painted by the Limbourg brothers; very few books of hours are as richly decorated as it.

Each section of the Belles Heures is customised to the personal wishes of its patron. The Belles Heures consists of a series of story-like cycles that read like picture books. Along with the Très Riches Heures, also made for Jean, the Belles Heures ranks among the great masterpieces of the Middle Ages. The manuscript is now in The Cloisters in New York.

== History ==
During the time that the Duke of Berry lived, France was an unsettled country, ravaged by the Hundred Years War and the Black Death, and further disrupted by revolts and rebellions. France was divided by a rivalry between the Burgundians and the Armagnacs and also had a lunatic king, Charles VI, which left the crown in contention and France unstable.

Despite the unstable situation in France, the Duke of Berry, uncle of Charles VI, commissioned many works of art. The Duke was renowned for his acquisition and commission of manuscripts and held one of the largest and most varied collections of his age. He was a generous patron and a collector of books. Berry employed the young brothers Herman, Paul, and Jean Limbourg as illuminators in 1404 following the death of their former patron, his brother Philip the Bold, Duke of Burgundy.

The Duke commissioned several lavish Books of Hours, including the most famous, the Très Riches Heures, parts of the Turin-Milan Hours, the Petites Heures of Jean de France, Duc de Berry and the Belles Heures. The Belles Heures is larger than the Très Riches Heures. It is known to have been created for Jean de Berry because it has an inscription by Jean Flamel, the duke’s scribe, stating the commissioner as "Prince John, ..., Duke of Berry...". Furthermore, numerous times throughout the Belles Heures, the Duke of Berry’s heraldry, emblem, and motto appear on some of the pages and illustrations. Also, because of the private nature of the book, the artists included many depictions of the Duke of Berry within the manuscript itself.

Confirmation of the artists who created the manuscript cannot be found in existing documents. However, the work is attributed to Paul, Herman, and Jean de Limbourg as well as probably a number of assistants. Scholars believe that the close relationship in style and illustrations between the Belles Heures and the Très Riches Heures is an indication of who created the work. Further support comes as documentation of a payment received by Paul from the Duke. This coincides with the understanding that Paul de Limbourg was employed by the Duke de Berry around the year 1409.

The manuscript remained in the possession of Berry until his death in 1416. Afterwards it was purchased by Yolande of Aragon, Duchess of Anjou. In 1954 it was purchased by J.D. Rockefeller Jr. from Baron Maurice de Rothschild with the intention that it be given to the Metropolitan Museum of Art in New York. The Belles Heures remains the only complete book from the hand of the Limbourgs, as the Très Riches Heures is unfinished.

== Principal Groups of Miniatures in the Belles Heures ==
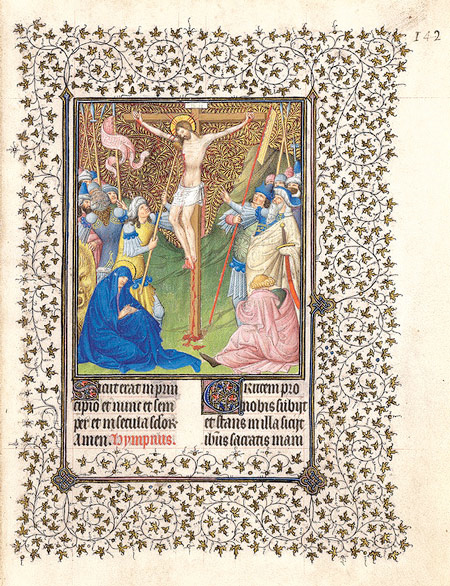
Crucifixion

- Calendar
- Story of St. Catherine
- Gospel Readings (Evangelists)
- Prayers to the Virgin (Aracoeli)
- Penitential Psalms
- Great Litany (Procession of St. Gregory)
- Hours of the Cross (Deposition)
- Hours of the Holy Spirit (Pentecost)
- Fifteen Joys of the Virgin
- Portrait of Jean de Berry
- Seven Prayers invoking the Incarnation and Passion
- Portrait of Jean de Boulogne
- Prayer to the Cross
- Story of Bruno
- Office of the Dead
- Office of the Passions
- Suffrage of the Saints
- Story of Heraclius
- Story of St. Jerome
- Story of St. Anthony Abbot and St. Paul the Hermit
- Masses
- Story of St. John the Baptist
- Story of St. Peter and St. Paul

== Technical Analysis ==
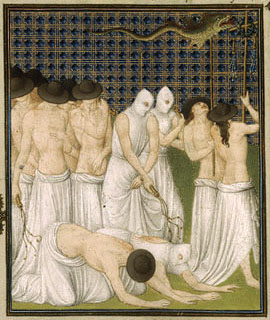
Detail of procession of flagellants

The original red velvet covers with golden clasps have long disappeared, however the book remains in remarkable condition. It contains 224 folios, 94 full-page and 54 column illustrations, as well as calendar vignettes and border illuminations. The illustrations appear as fresh as the artists “left them when they finished their task and cleaned their brushes five hundred and forty-odd years ago”. Berry only wanted the best, thus only the best vellum would have been used. Because of the private nature of the Belles Heures, little to no restoration is evident. The book is in excellent condition as it was kept as a prized possession in the libraries of successive owners.

In 2008 the book was unbound for photography for a facsimile edition, and investigation and conservation, which allowed for a period afterwards the exhibition together of numbers of pages. A selection of 80 pages were exhibited at the Getty Museum in California in 2008-2009.

== Illumination ==
The miniatures painted in the Belles Heures are normally rectangular in shape, and higher than they are wide. In some cases, the illuminators experimented with breaking across the borders to accommodate projections extending beyond the frame. An unusual aspect of this particular book of hours is that unlike others, each of the cycles consists of a series of miniatures which are uninterrupted by text. “The shortest (the Legend of the Cross) contains three miniatures, the longest (the life of St. Jerome), twelve.” The art in this book of hours although conforming to the time period, also holds a great deal of experimentation.

Other works that are similar are the Très Riches Heures and the Grandes Heures du Duc de Berry both of which had been illuminated by the Limbourg brothers. They are similar in style and in the International Gothic style of which the brothers were pioneers in France. The bright colours and stylistic interpretations of form and depth are all quite similar through these works. However, the Belles Heures has been considered the best work of the three.

The use of depth and movement in the art is a defining quality exhibited by the Belle Heures. Attempts at creating forms in movement and in different positions often do not depict reality and though garments sometimes suggest the shape of bodies beneath them, they are often moving in an unrealistic manner. Despite this the illustrations do convey the message of movement and the human form.

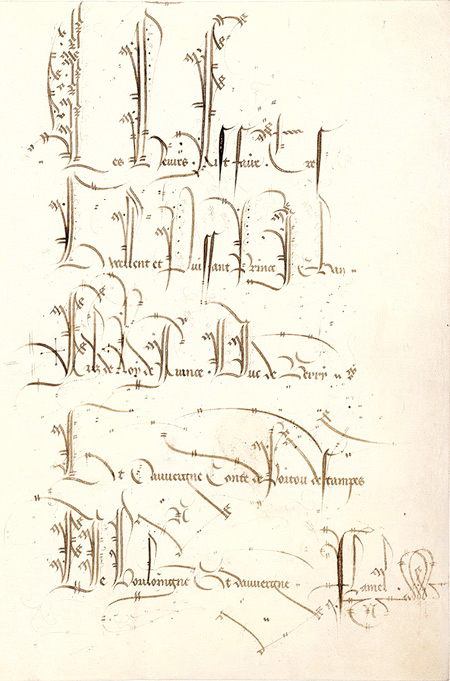
Folio 1r with the elaborate ex libris inscription

Considerable effort has been placed in creating realistic backgrounds to the illustrations. Attempts at creating a sense of atmospheric depth are evident in many of the miniatures. Parts of buildings are drawn where the rest of the structure continues off the frame. In this manner the painting was only a snapshot of what was occurring and the background continued outside of the frame. Alternatively, there are many instances where the backgrounds remain unrealistic - those with gold fleur-de-lis and patterning that is reminiscent of a heavenly depiction. Differences in the choice of backgrounds plays a role in the setting of the events depicted, but also shows an effort to move to a more lifelike realm in paintings. Furthermore, a great deal of effort was put into the foreshortening the elements of the picture. What this illustrates is the artists are more interested in creating perspective. The significance of this for the time is monumental as many of the attempts at creating depth in the background and landscape were new discoveries. The artists of the Belle Heures seem to struggle between existing artistic norms and the transition to creating greater realism in shape, form, and perspective.

Besides their experimentation in depth, bright colours, and dramatic movements, the illuminators of the Belle Heures were excellent story-tellers. The depictions of Christian scenes are impactful and emotional. Faces and positioning of characters exemplify significance of the events to the observer. There is little debate about the emotions and feelings depicted within the illustrations. Surveyors of the artwork are not just looking at it but are drawn into the work.

In contrast to the vibrant and detailed illustrations, the artists did not focus on bordering as much as most other manuscript illuminators. The borders throughout the manuscript serve only as “broad sparkling frames” to accompany the fanciful and powerful miniatures. Fine filigree used in the border is stunningly simple and equally underwhelming. Ivy in the upper border is simply drawn and patterned. On occasion the ivy in the upper border becomes more elaborate, colourful, and active with the inclusion of dragon-like creatures sitting atop the borders. Often lacking such active elements, the borders do not distract the eyes away from the illuminations. Although an effective way to focus the viewer’s eye on to the illuminations, the simplicity in the borders can be possibly explained by a lack of formal training. The Limbourg brothers were not primarily trained in manuscript illumination; two of them were apprenticed to goldsmiths, while the other was a panel painter. Thus, what became most important in their manuscripts were the miniatures. However, certain exceptions to the bordering exist. The first folios of most of the principal divisions and that of the three Suffrages have much more elaborate borders than those found on other folios.

== Iconographic Analysis ==
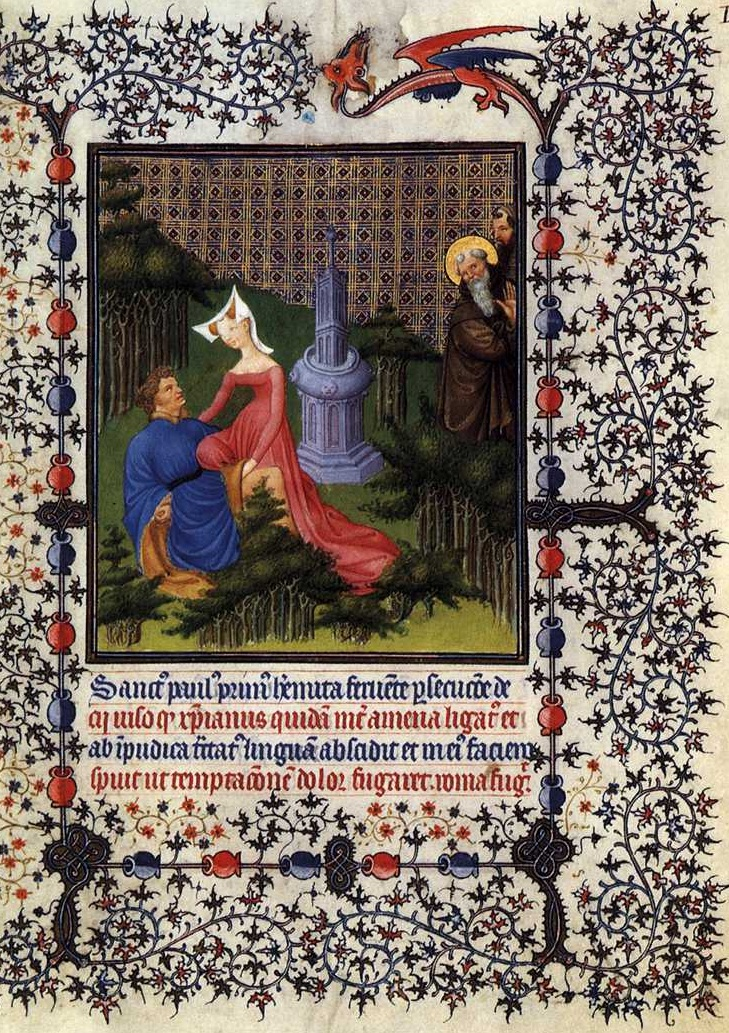
Story of a saint

The figures in the Belles Heures include Saint Catherine, the Four Evangelists, St Jerome, John the Baptist, St Paul the Hermit and many others including, Jean de France, the Duke of Berry himself. These figures appear often and prominently as they are central figures in medieval Christianity. Miniatures coinciding with the prayers give ample suggestion as to who or what is occurring within the frame of the illustration. Some of the more important works were Jean de Berry, David, and those in the cycle of St. Catherine.

As this was a work for Jean de Berry, it was quite common for the commissioners of such private endeavours to appear within them. Jean de Berry is depicted in prayer, kneeling at a private oratory. His blue robes and colourful dress give him the look of royalty. Also, the illumination is given a political aspect and confirms Jean's status by including a mace, a coronet, as well as the arm of an attendant pulling back the drapes.

One depiction is particularly important; that of David in the Penitential Psalms. Nearly all book of hours contained this section but they were rarely illuminated. So in this case, the illustrators had very little to work from. The depiction of David against the sky made of fleur-de-lis is representative of royal and heavenly status. This miniature is representative of the style of Herman, because of the restless patterns and the combination of colours.

The cycle of St. Catherine in the Belles Heures is the first and one of the longest sets of scenes to be depicted. Her aristocratic beauty is depicted by the contemporary long hair, slender neck, sloped shoulders, and pale complexion. In this image, Catherine is depicted as a scholarly and educated individual. She is seated, reading, while there remain a great number of books resting on a stand nearby. The stand is significant because Moses is perched upon the top. Moses, the representation of the written word, fits well in the scene of St. Catherine studying for the reason that he received the ten commandments upon Mt. Sinai where, eventually, St. Catherine was to be buried. Furthermore, a chapel was dedicated to Moses in the church of St. Catherine built upon the side of Mt. Sinai.

The text and images are rich with iconographical substance. The Belles Heures contains many iconographical events and subjects right alongside liturgical texts that relate to and nearly describe the events occurring in the miniature. Such is the case of illumination. The miniatures are used to supplement the textual references to Christian faith. In order to comprehend the immensity and number of subjects depicted and illuminated in the Belles Heures, one must look at the manuscript (or a facsimile thereof) itself.

Millard Meiss describes the Belles Heures, and the Très Riches Heures that followed it, are the most impressive group of paintings produced in Europe in the early part of the 15th century. The bright colours predate the similar style to emerge from Italy closer to the middle of the 15th century. Luminous colours used in the Belles Heures entered the mainstream of 15th-century paintings. Not long after its creation, colour began to fade in importance and dark hues and shadowing began to emerge in the late 15th century. Thus, the Belles Heures was one of the last few manuscripts to be coloured in this manner.
