= Raymond Diocrès =

French university professor (died 1084)

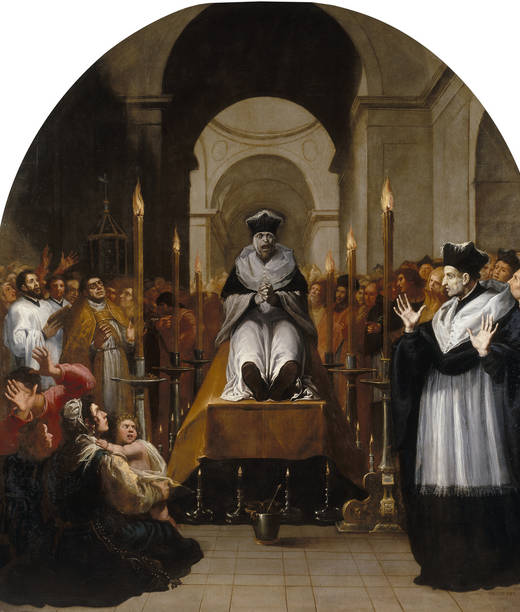
Saint Bruno's Conversion before the Body of Diocrès (Vincenzo Carducci, c. 1630)

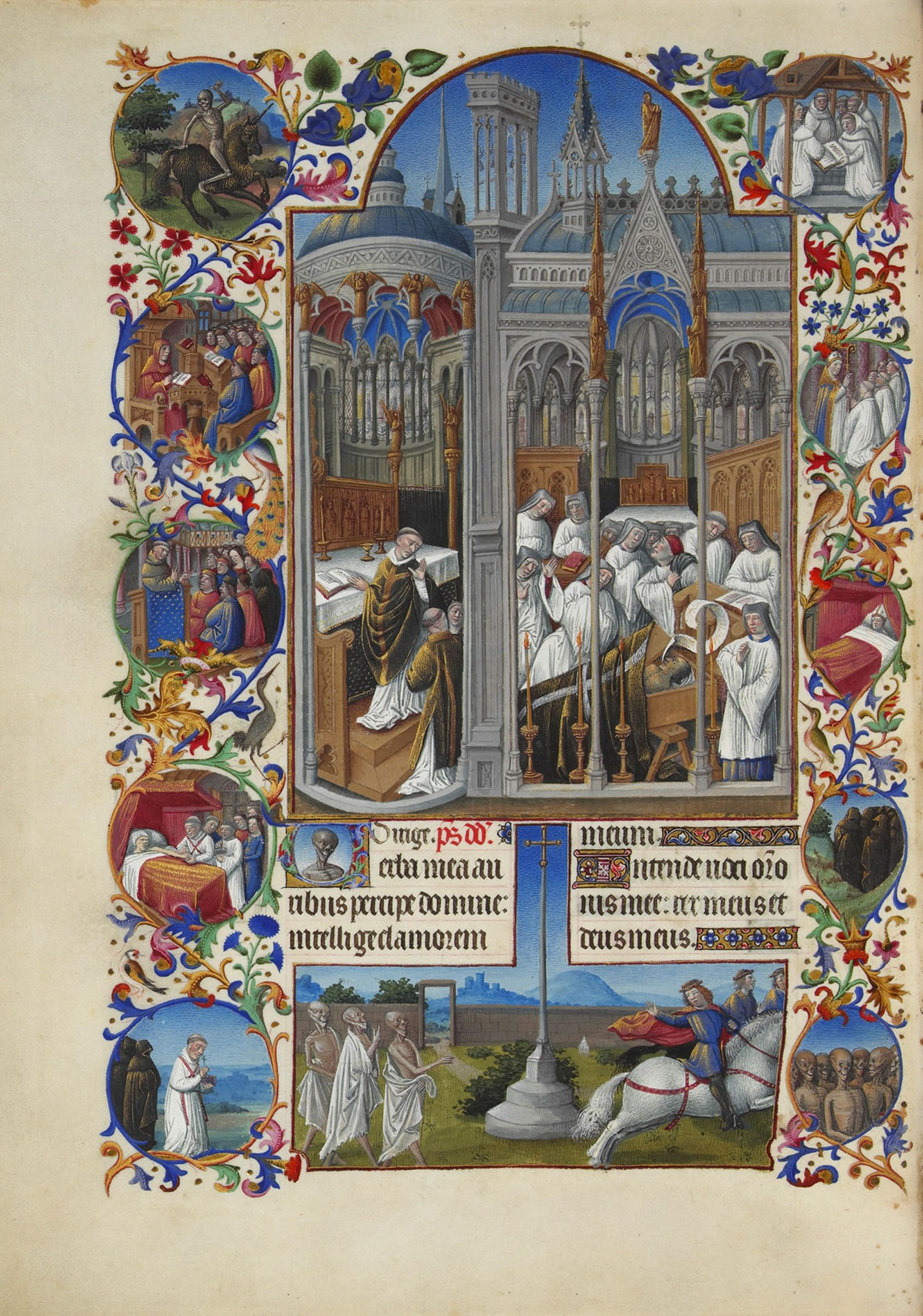
The Funeral of Raymond Diocrès, from the Très Riches Heures du Duc de Berry (Jean Colombe, c. 1485). A speech scroll issues from the mouth of Diocrès' corpse.

Raymond Diocrès (died 1084) was a "Parisian university professor and canon" and the subject of a miracle.

Diocrès is known for a miracle that took place at his funeral, which was depicted in several artistic works. The story goes that at his funeral Diocrès briefly returned to life, in order to swear to the assembly that God had judged and condemned his soul. One of his students, Bruno of Cologne, upon witnessing this miracle, decided to abandon civil life and become a monk, thus founding the Carthusian order.

The funeral of Raymond Diocrès figures in illuminated scenes from the Très Riches Heures du Duc de Berry. Painters such as Vincenzo Carducci, Gregorio Bausá, and Eustache Le Sueur also depicted scenes from Diocrès' life, especially those related to Bruno of Cologne.
