= Val-Dieu Apocalypse =

14th-century French illuminated manuscript

The Val-Dieu Apocalypse
- The British Library, Additional MS 17333
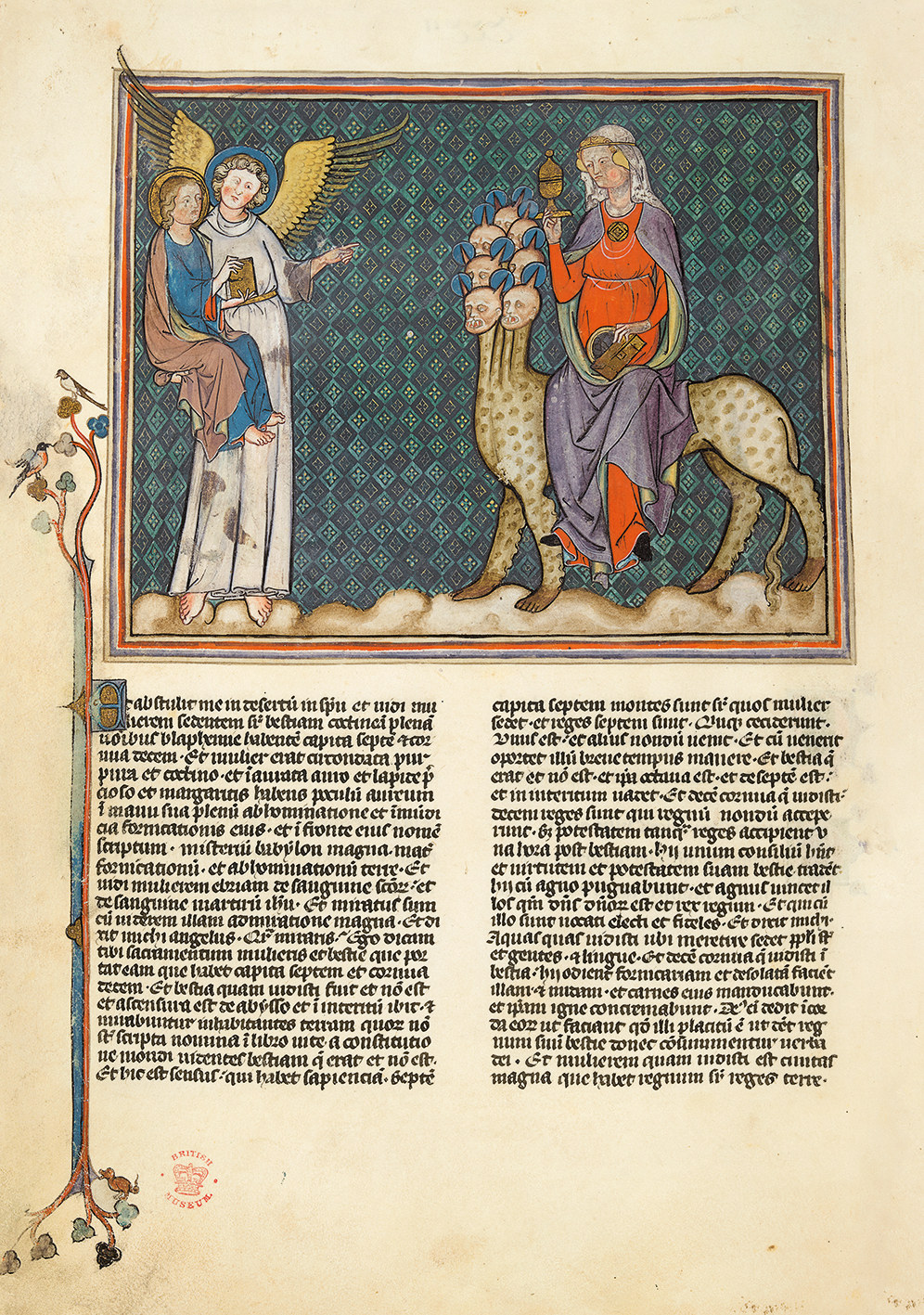
- Date: 1320s
- Place of origin: Normandy
- Language(s): Latin and French
- Patron: Olivier II Pesnel and Alice de Courcy (his wife)
- Material: parchment
- Size: 325 × 225 mm; 47 folios
- Contents: Book of Revelation
- Illumination: 83 half-page miniatures
- Previously kept: Carthusian monastery of Val-Dieu in south Normandy (diocese of Séez)

The Val-Dieu Apocalypse is a richly illuminated medieval manuscript of the Book of Revelation, produced in the 1320s in Normandy, likely in the Cotentin region, possibly in or near the city of Coutances, as suggested by heraldic evidence within the book. It is now in the British Library in London, as Additional MS 17333.

The manuscript belongs to a group of four extant “Norman Apocalypses” – along with the Saint-Victor Apocalypse (Paris, Bibliothèque nationale de France, Latin 14410), Cloisters Apocalypse (New York, Metropolitan Museum of Art, Ms. 68.174), and Namur Apocalypse (Namur, Séminaire Notre-Dame, Ms. 77) – created in Normandy in the 14th century, but drawing on late 13th-century English models. Closely related in both style and iconography, these manuscripts share a characteristic layout: framed half-page rectangular Gothic miniatures set above two columns of Revelation text. Among them, the Val-Dieu Apocalypse stands out for its particularly lavish illumination, especially its vibrant, saturated colours and fully painted backgrounds. It is also unique within the group in that it contains not only the Latin text of Revelation, but also its French translation.

== Style and iconography ==
The Val-Dieu Apocalypse contains 83 surviving half-page miniatures from an original 85 (the upper half of folio 9 was cut away, removing two scenes), along with numerous illuminated initials, most of them enriched with foliate border extensions and occasional drolleries (animals, dragons).

The iconography of the Val-Dieu Apocalypse derives primarily from mid-13th-century English Apocalypses of the Metz–Lambeth group. While the manuscript generally follows its English models closely, roughly a third of its scenes show notable deviations or creative reinterpretations, such as added narrative details. Four scenes in particular: the Mighty Angel giving John the book to eat (f. 15v) and episodes relating to the fall of Babylon (ff. 33r, 36v, 37r), appear to be original inventions by the Val-Dieu artists.

The Val-Dieu Apocalypse exemplifies the elegant style of early 14th-century Norman illumination, but it is distinguished above all by its richly painted, fully saturated backgrounds, which are often diapered to fill empty space, an enhancement that sets it apart from the more wash-based techniques of the related Namur, Saint-Victor, and Cloisters Apocalypses. Its palette favours bold reds, deep blues and greens, plum, and a distinctive yellow-green produced by layering pigments. Sophisticated scene compositions, graceful yet expressive poses, and rich hues all lend the Val-Dieu Apocalypse its dramatic intensity. The figures combine a Parisian-style Gothic sway in their stances with monumental proportions and vibrant colouring. The manuscript is also characterized by strong linear drawing: heavy black line is used to outline forms and articulate depth and three-dimensionality (especially in the complex fold patterns of the drapery), possibly paralleling techniques seen in contemporary Norman stained glass.

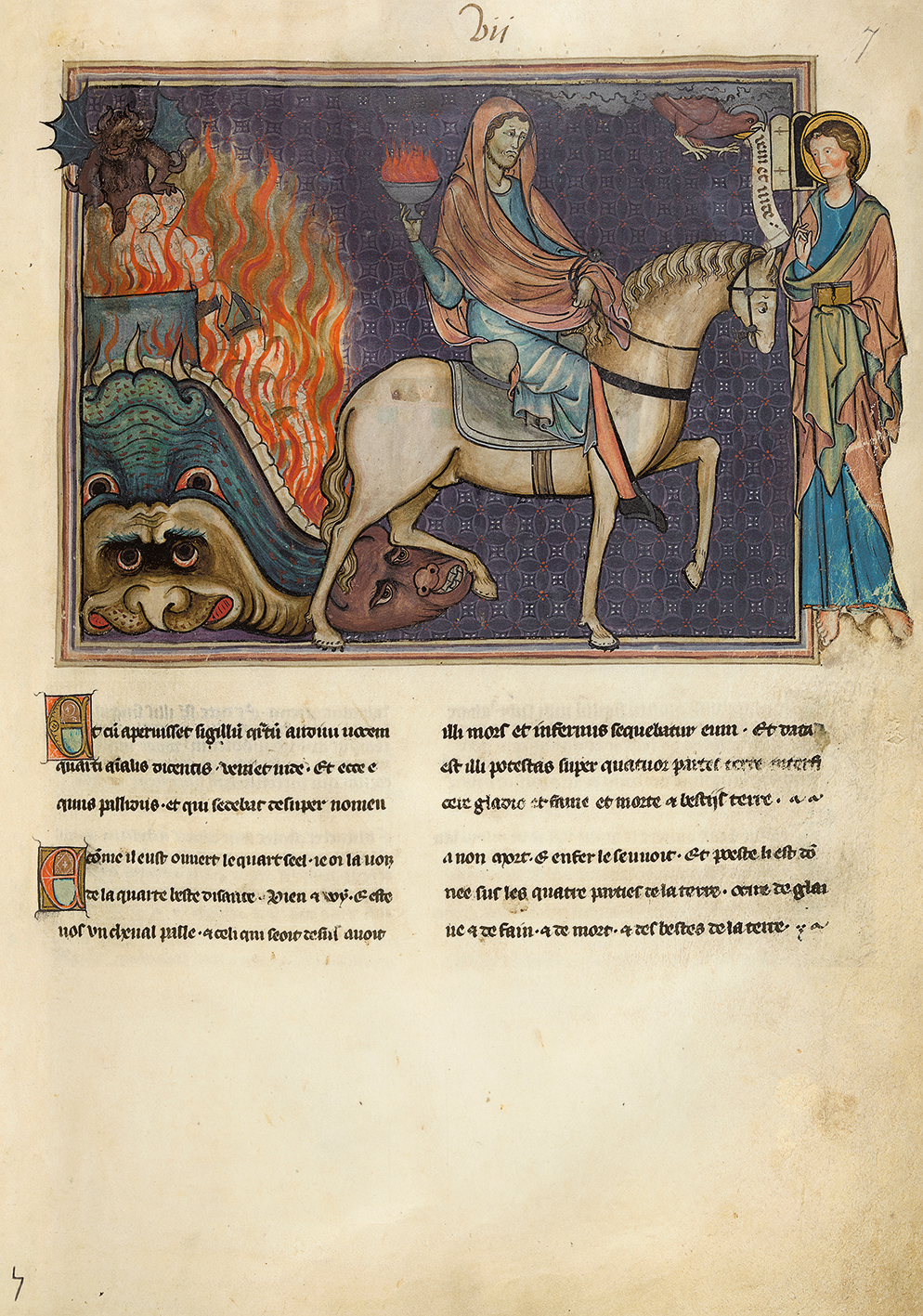
The Fourth Horseman, f. 7r

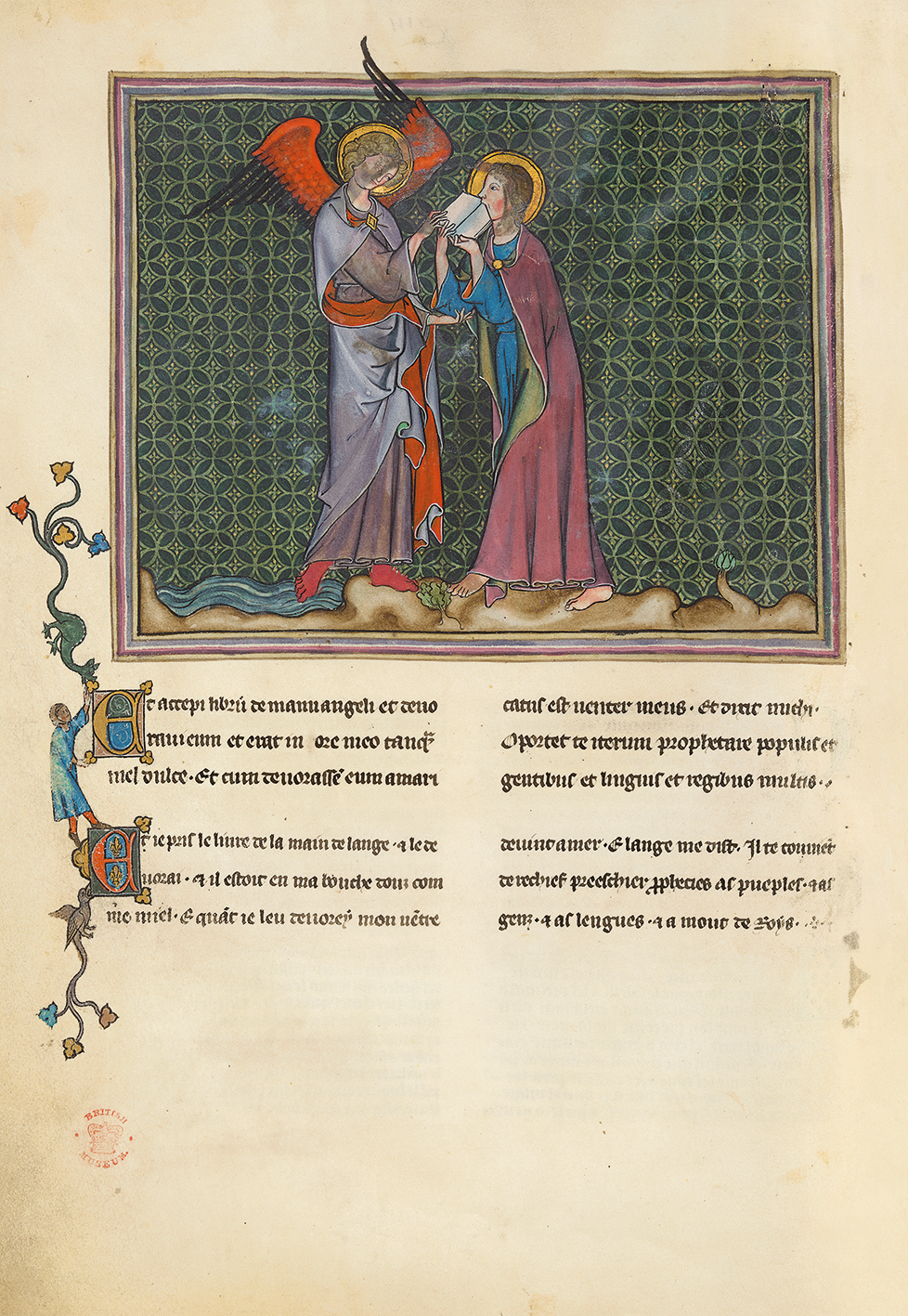
The Mighty Angel gives John the book to eat, f. 15v

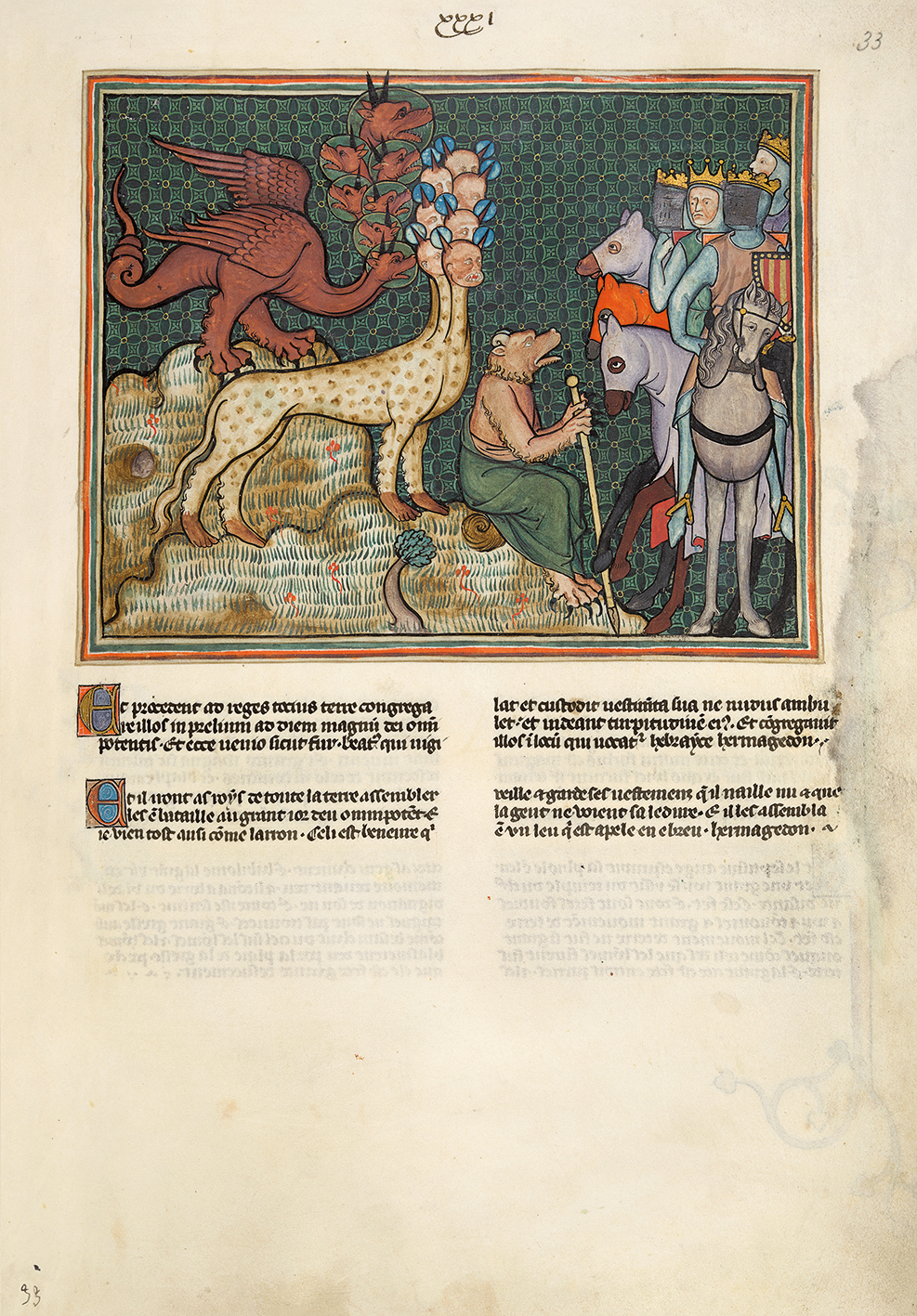
Dragon, Beast from the Sea and False Prophet gather nations at Armageddon, f. 33r

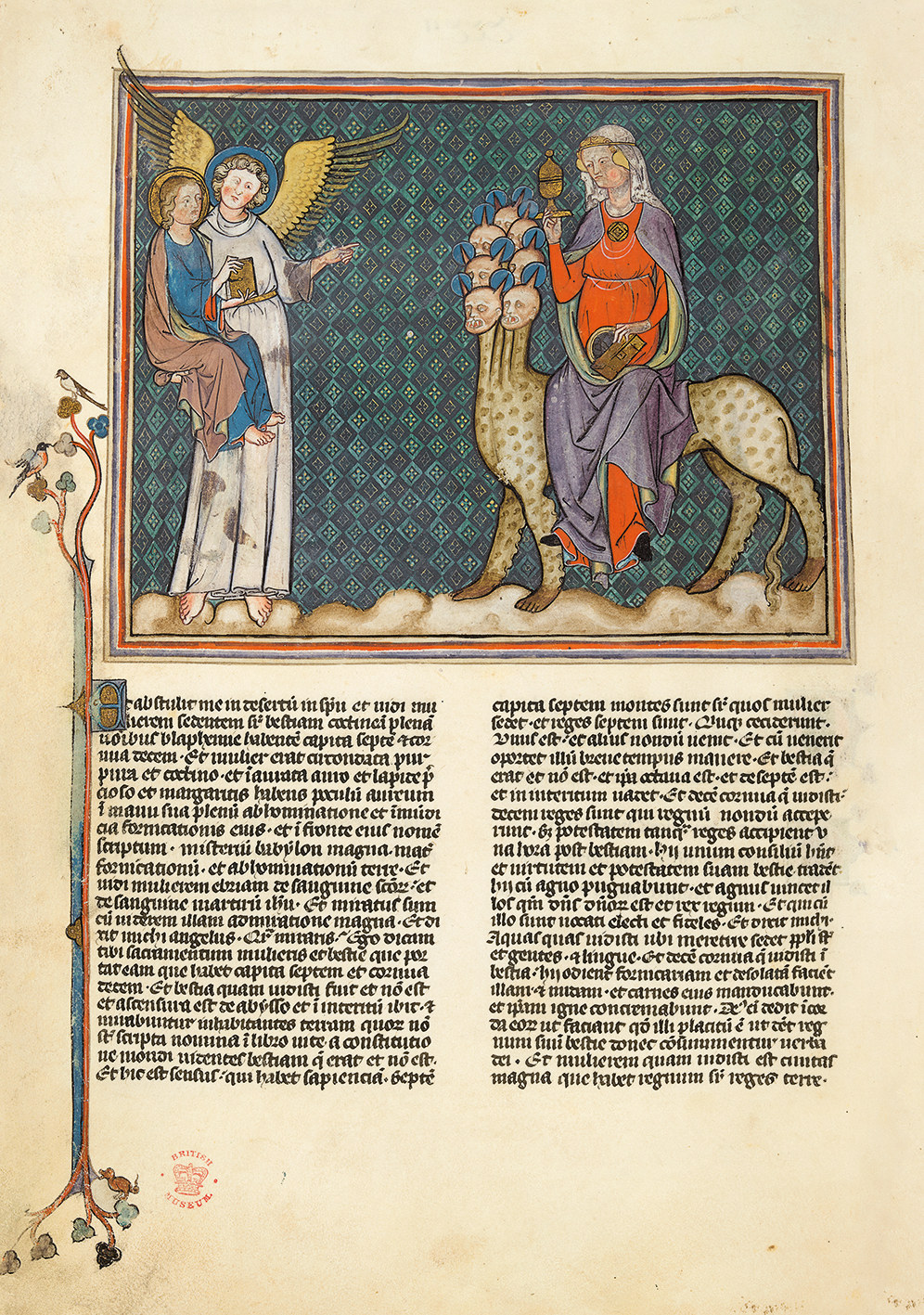
The Great Harlot of Babylon seated on the Beast, f. 34v

== Text ==
Unlike the other Norman Apocalypses, the Val-Dieu Apocalypse incorporates not only a version of the Latin Vulgate text of the Book of Revelation, but also a French prose translation unique to this manuscript, greatly expanding its textual content. Together, the Latin and French texts create a uniquely careful and coherent bilingual version of Revelation within the Apocalypse manuscript tradition. Linguistic evidence suggests that the translation was produced in Normandy around 1320–30, consistent with the manuscript’s artistic dating. Unusually precise for a medieval French Apocalypse, the text is so accurate that scholars have proposed it may represent not a copy but the original translation – an idea supported by traces of untranslated Latin and by layout-driven abbreviations that appear to reflect the translator working directly beneath the Latin. To accommodate the added vernacular material, the manuscript even includes inserted parchment pieces with only the French translation (ff. 13, 35, 44).
