= Tribhanga =

Body position in traditional Indian art and dance

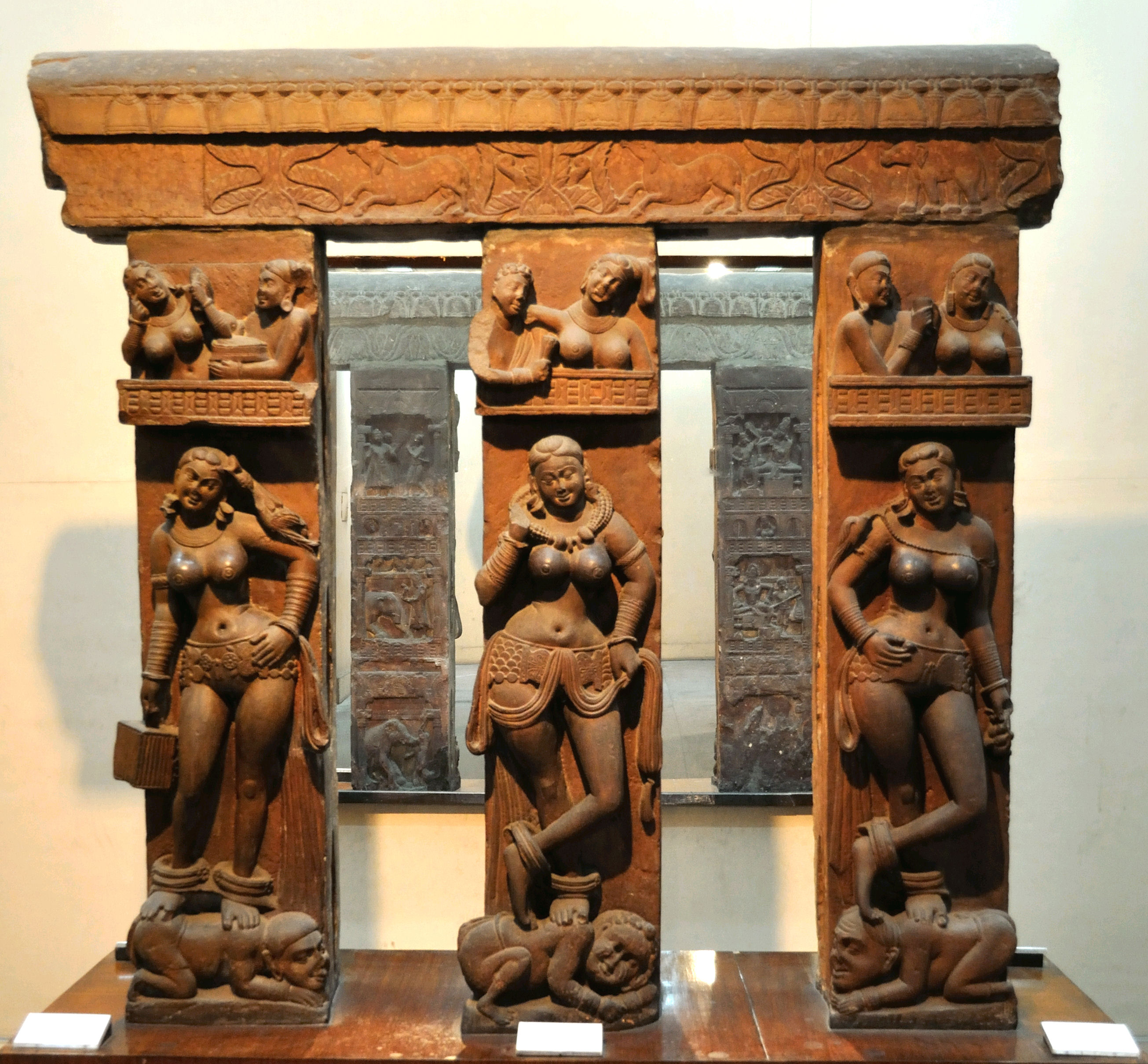
Bhutesvara Yakshis (2nd century CE), Mathura art

Tribhaṅga or Tribunga is a standing body position or stance used in traditional Indian art and Indian classical dance forms like the Odissi, where the body bends in one direction at the knees, the other direction at the hips and then the other again at the shoulders and neck.

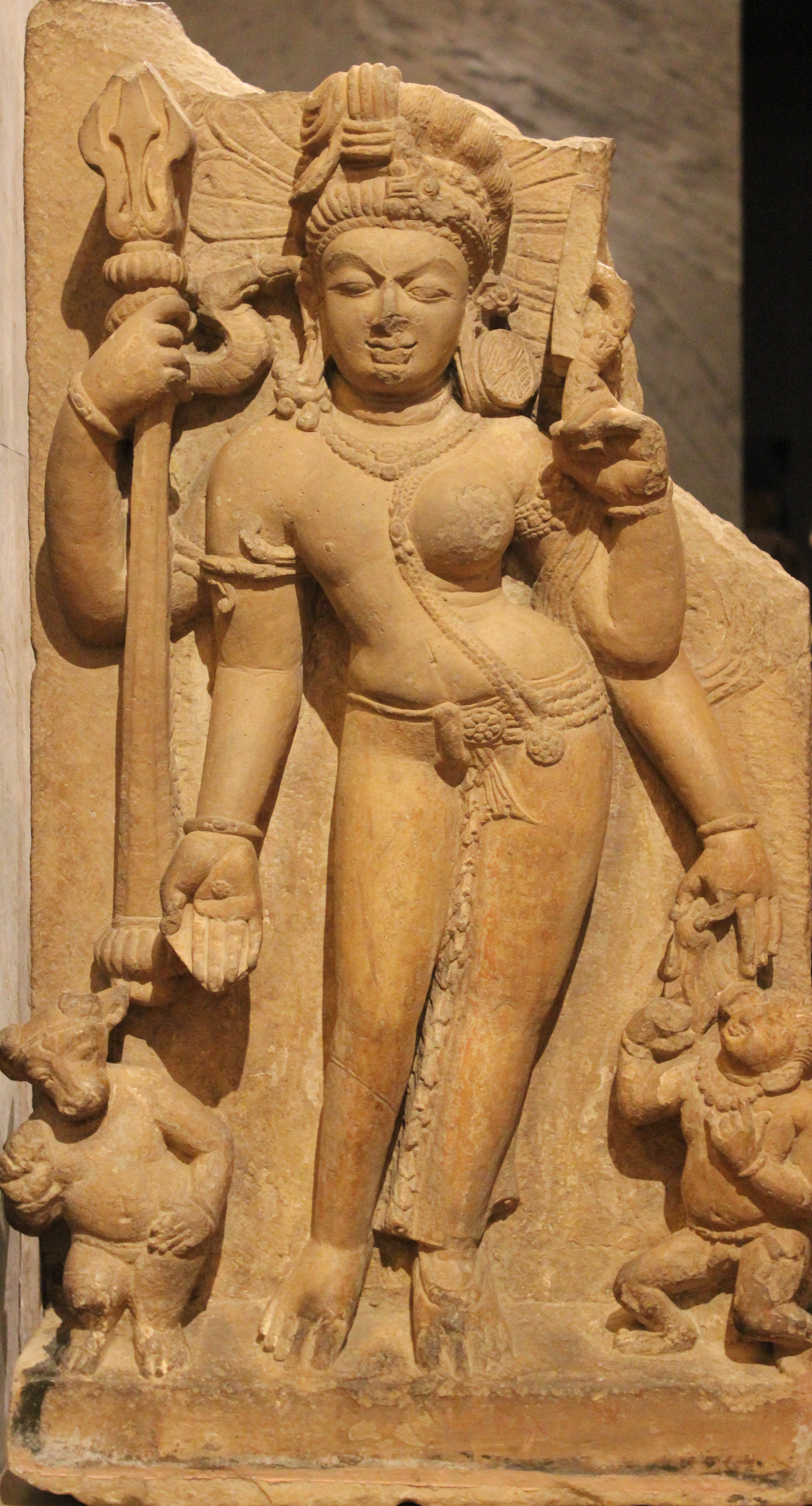
Ardhanarishvara, the composite deity of Shiva and his consort Parvati. As in other images of this form, the tribhanga is accentuated by the gender differences at hip and shoulders.

The pose goes back at least 2,000 years in Indian art, and has been highly characteristic for much of this period, "found repeated over and over again in countless examples of Indian sculpture and painting". Indian religions carried it to East and South-East Asia. Like the equivalent contrapposto and "S Curve" poses in Western art, it suggests movement in figures and gives "rhythmic fluidity and ... youthful energy".

The word derives from Sanskrit, where bhanga (or bhangha) is the word for an attitude or position, with tri meaning "triple", making "triple-bend position". Other poses described in old texts on dance were samabhanga for the "figure in equipoise", whether standing, sitting or reclining, and abhanga for a slight bend in one leg giving a smaller curve to the figure. Other more complex positions in dance are atibhanga; the famous Shiva Nataraja figures are examples of this.

== History ==
The history of the stance is often said to reach back to the famous Dancing Girl from Mohenjo-Daro, of about c. 2300–1750 BCE, although this does not exactly show the usual later form. It may well derive from dance before art, but the remaining record in early art is more clear. The earliest versions are nearly all in female figures, but it gradually spread to males. Versions of the stance can be seen in (Buddhist) yakshi at Bharhut, c. 100 BCE, and the classical form of the stance at Sanchi, around 10 CE, and the Bhutesvara Yakshis (2nd century CE).

The pose is used on many coins of the Gupta Empire (c. 319 to 543 CE), by both the kings on the obverse and the deities on the reverse, and in Gupta sculpture. During this period it became very common in both Buddhist and Hindu art (as well as Jain art). The most famous ancient Indian painting, the large figure of Padmapani in Cave 1 at the Ajanta Caves (c. 478) has the pose, which remains common in bodhisattva figures.

The style of the stance changes somewhat over the centuries, and between different regions inside and outside India, as it was carried abroad, mainly to the east and south-east, in the art of both major religions. To simplify considerably, the earlier depictions in Gupta art and Post-Gupta art show major figures in mildly-bent stances, with more pronounced poses in minor figures and especially female ones such as apsaras and yakshini.

By perhaps the 9th century the stronger version of the stance spreads to most types of figures, and becomes even more marked. This tendency begins to reduce from about the 13th century. The Buddha only ever has a slight tribhanga stance and the Jain tirthankaras are almost never depicted in the pose. Vishnu and Brahma also only usually have slight versions of the stance; the famous temples of Khajuraho, which provide a profusion of tribhanga poses, include examples for both of them. Krishna playing his flute is very consistently depicted in a version of the pose with one lower leg crossed over (or behind) the other and on tip-toe, and he and Shiva are more often given stronger versions of the stance.

In the Buddhist and Hindu art of East Asia and South-East Asia, the stance tends to be a mark of recent Indian influence in early periods, and figures, especially major ones, then gradually straighten as time passes. In all areas this tendency may not apply to figures actually shown as dancing.

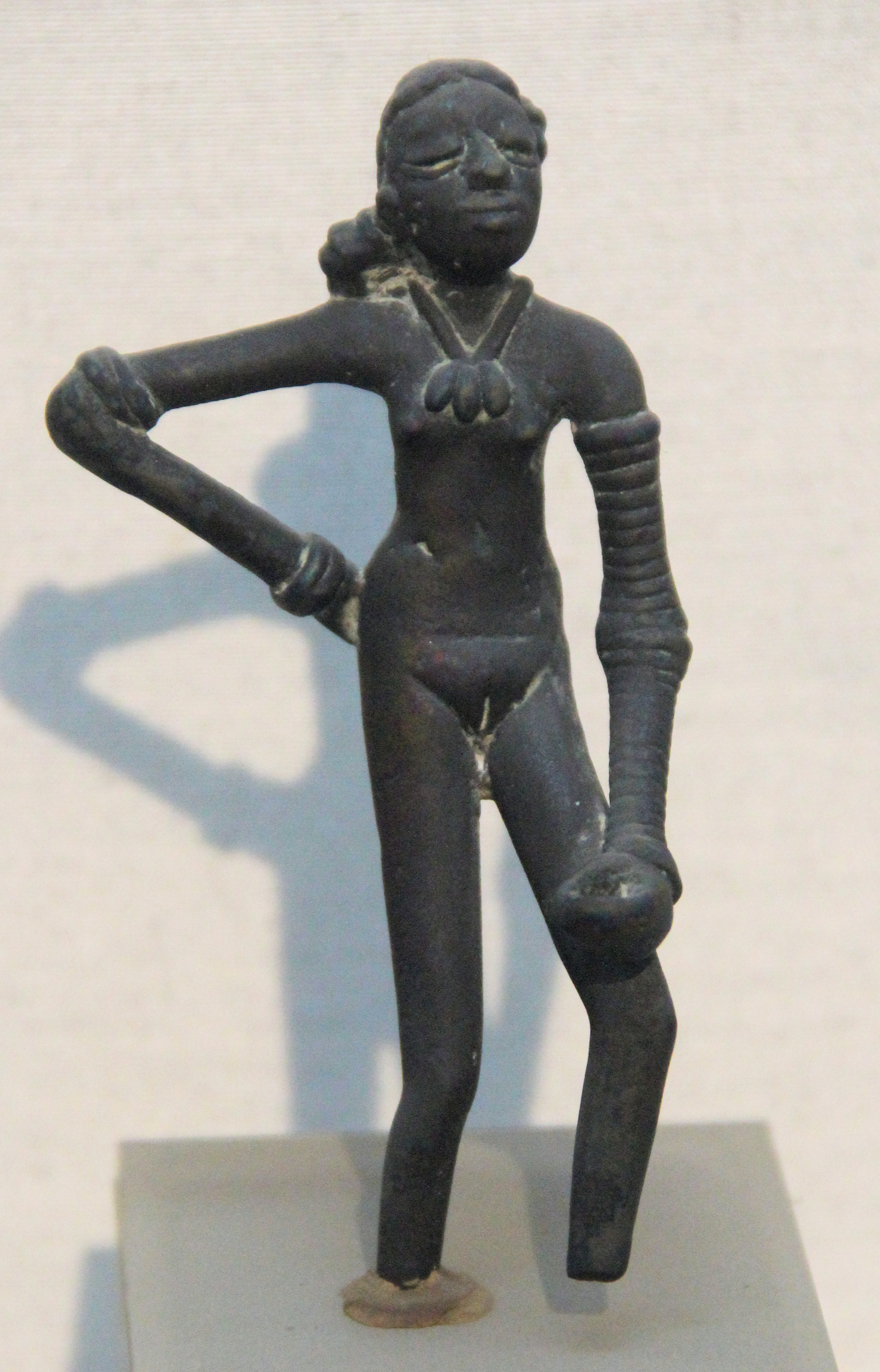
Dancing Girl from Mohenjo-Daro, c. 2300–1750 BCE

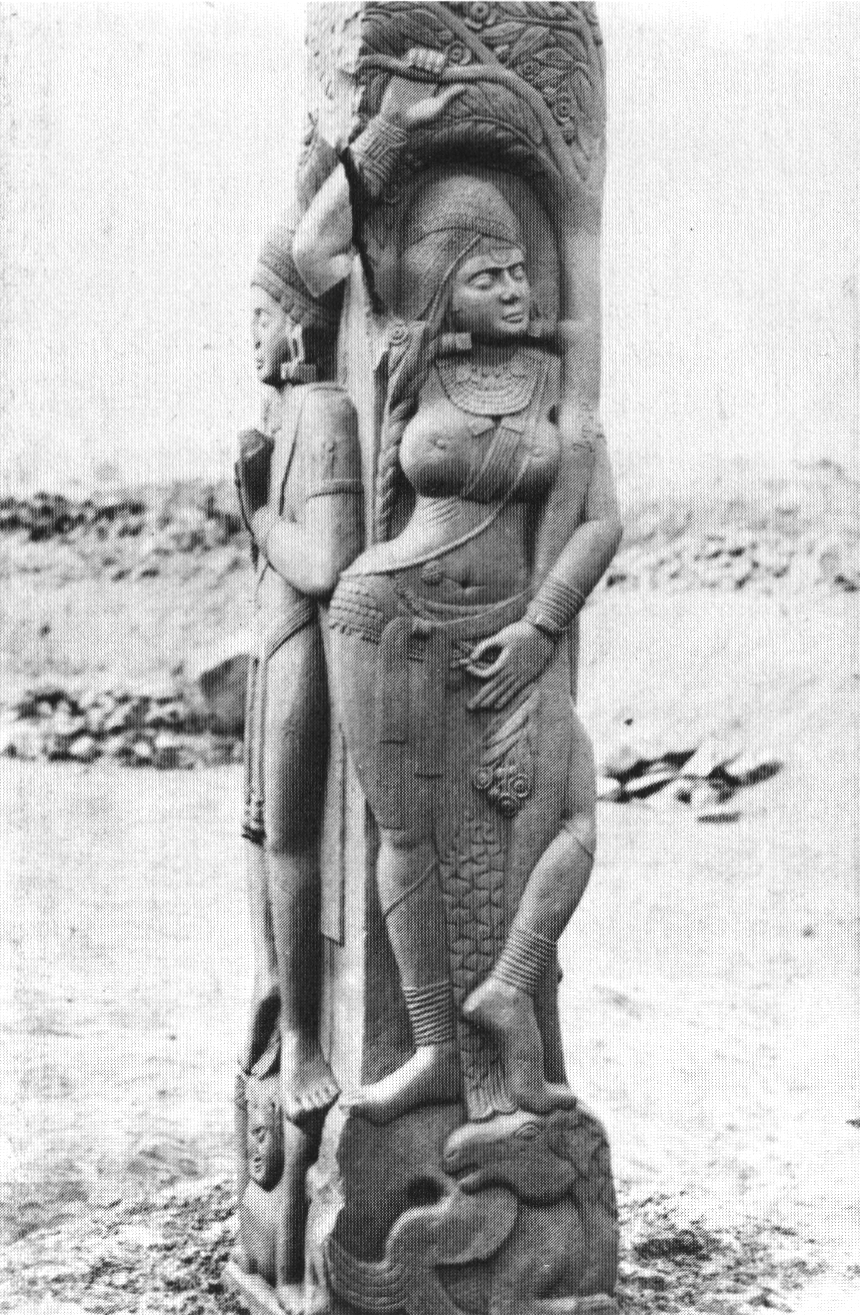
Buddhist yakshi at Bharhut, c. 100 BCE

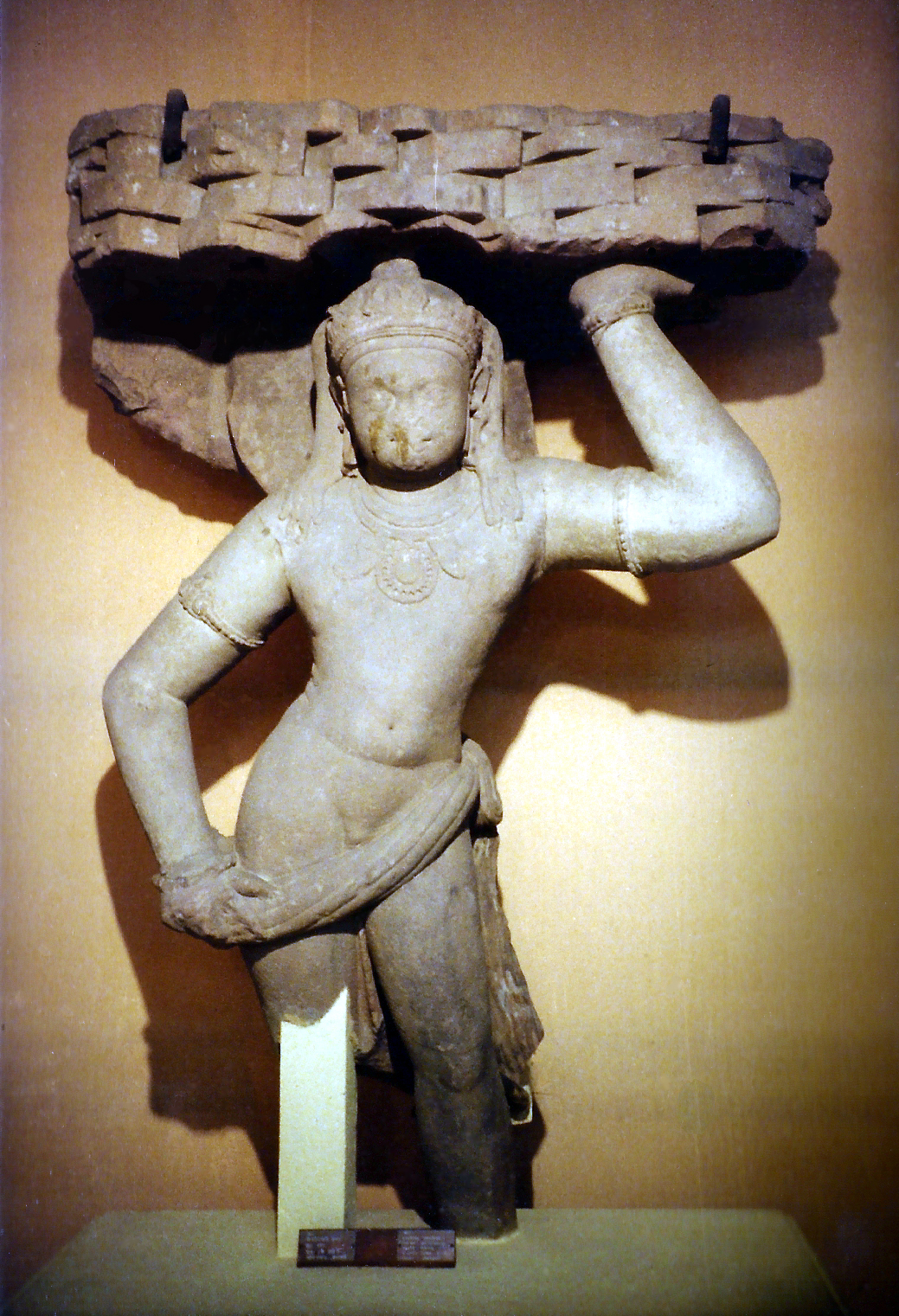
Gupta Krishna lifting Mount Govardhana, 4th to 6th century

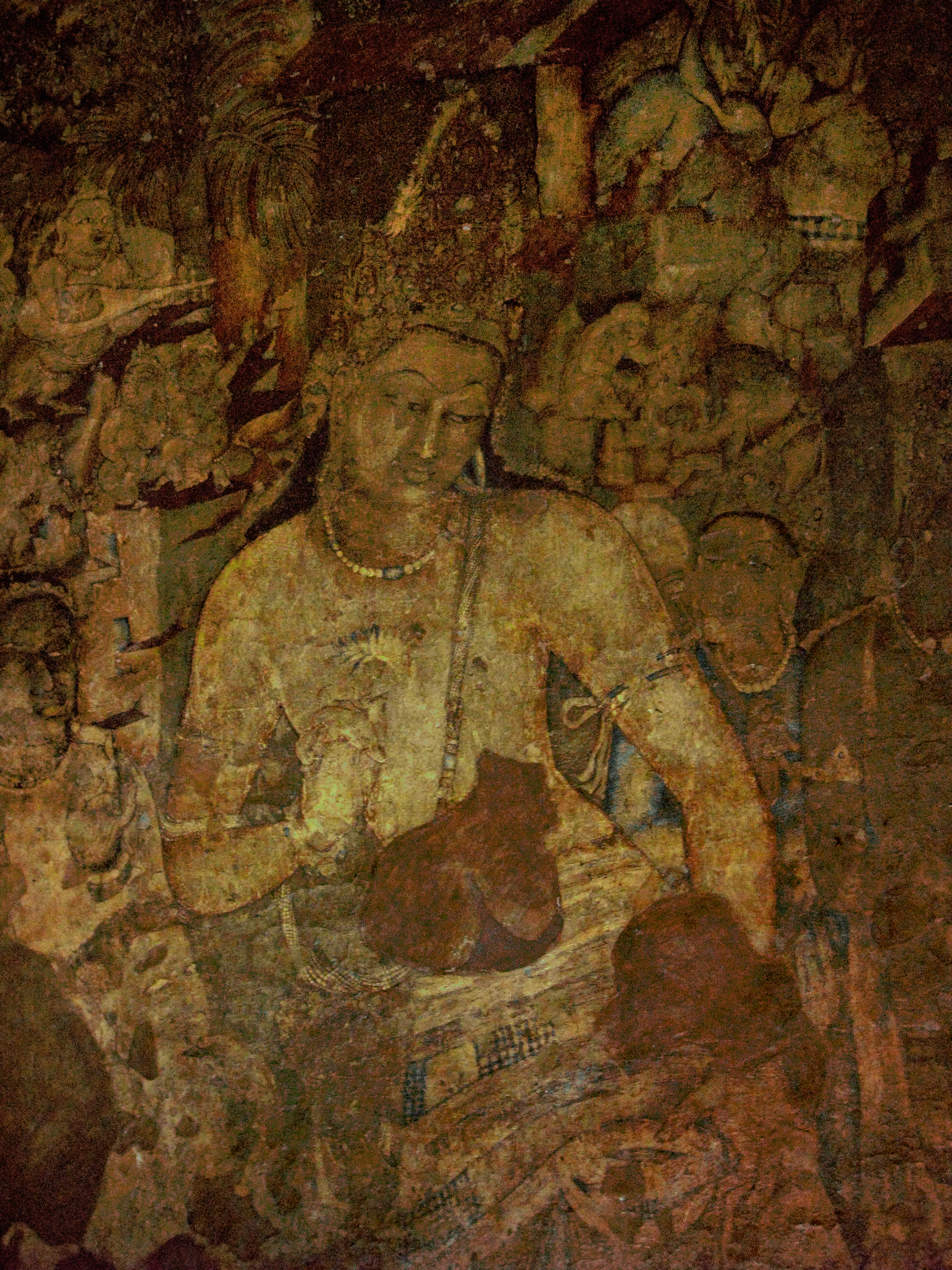
Bodhisattva Padmapani, Ajanta Caves, cave 1, late 5th century

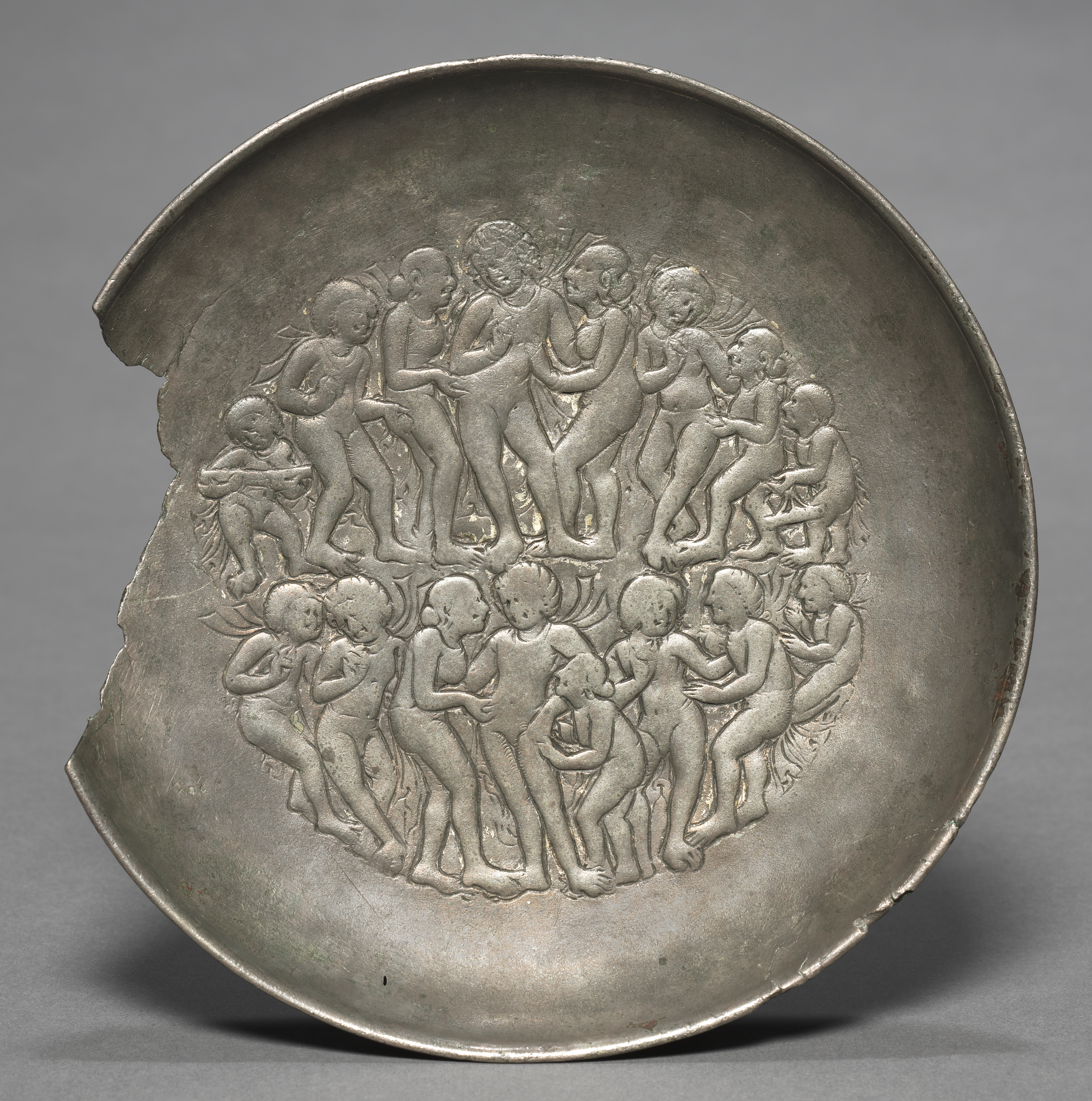
Tribhanga poses in a scene of people celebrating a festival, a rare example of secular Gupta art

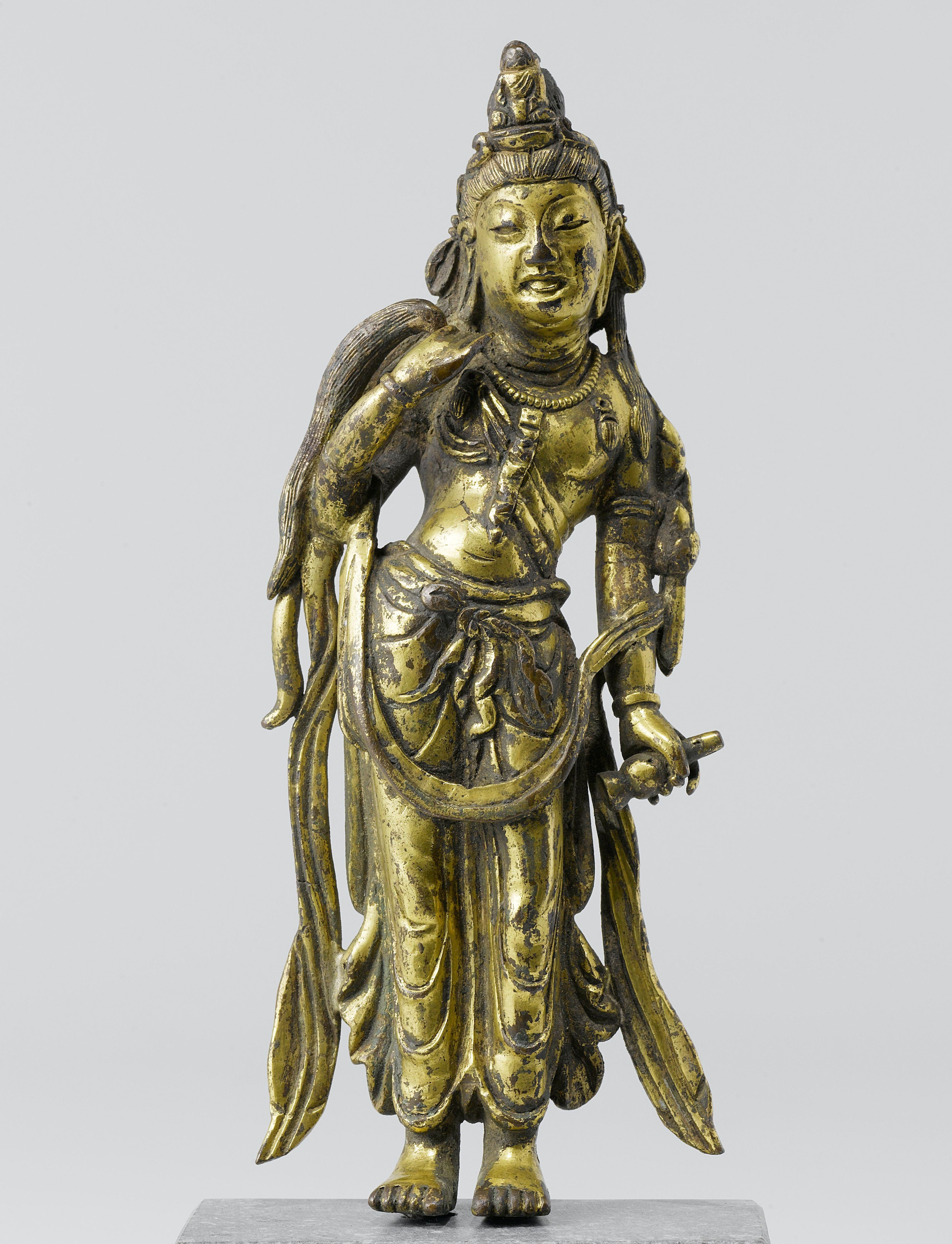
Chinese gilt-bronze Guanyin, Tang dynasty

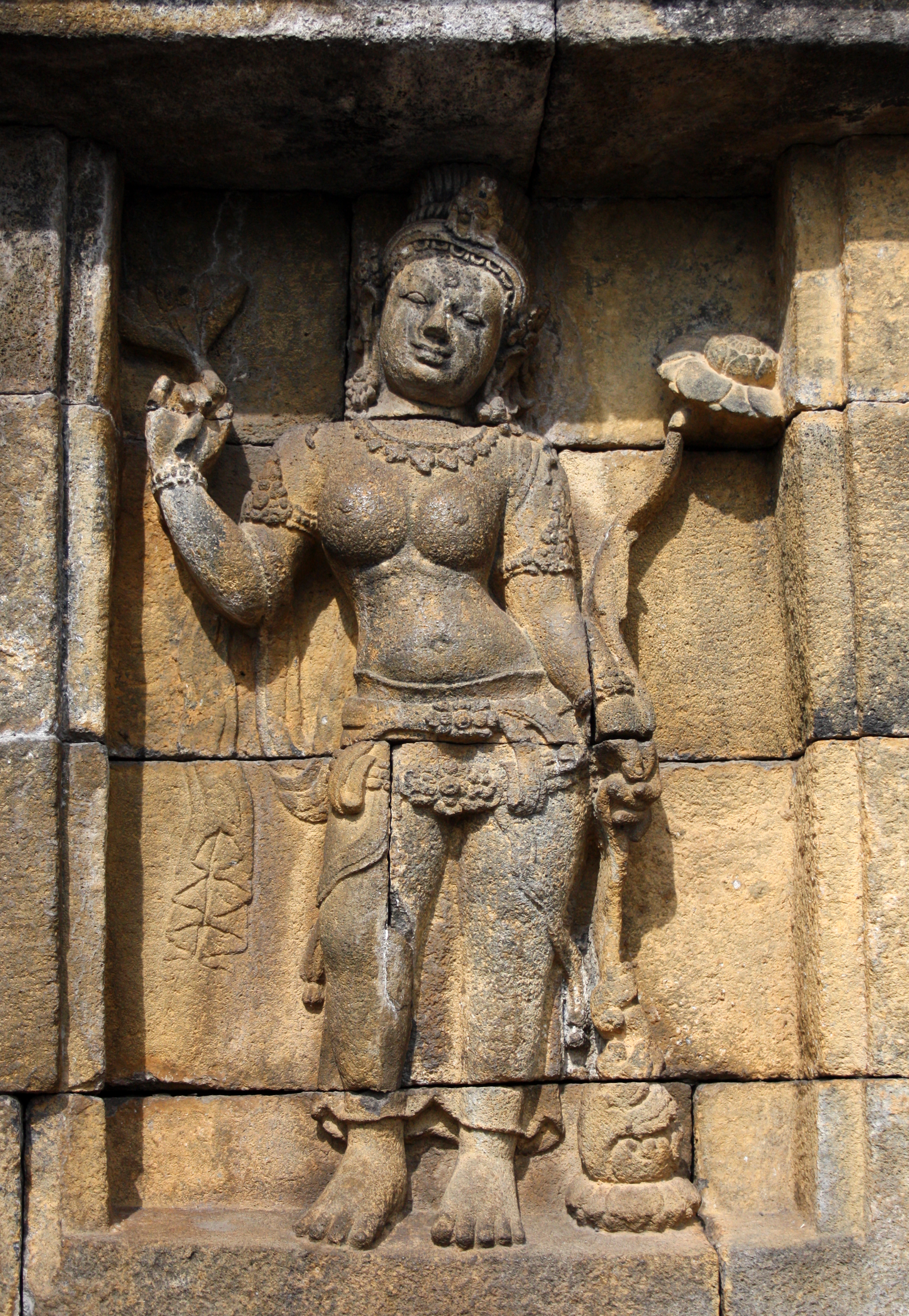
Tara at Borobudur, Java, Indonesia, 9th century.

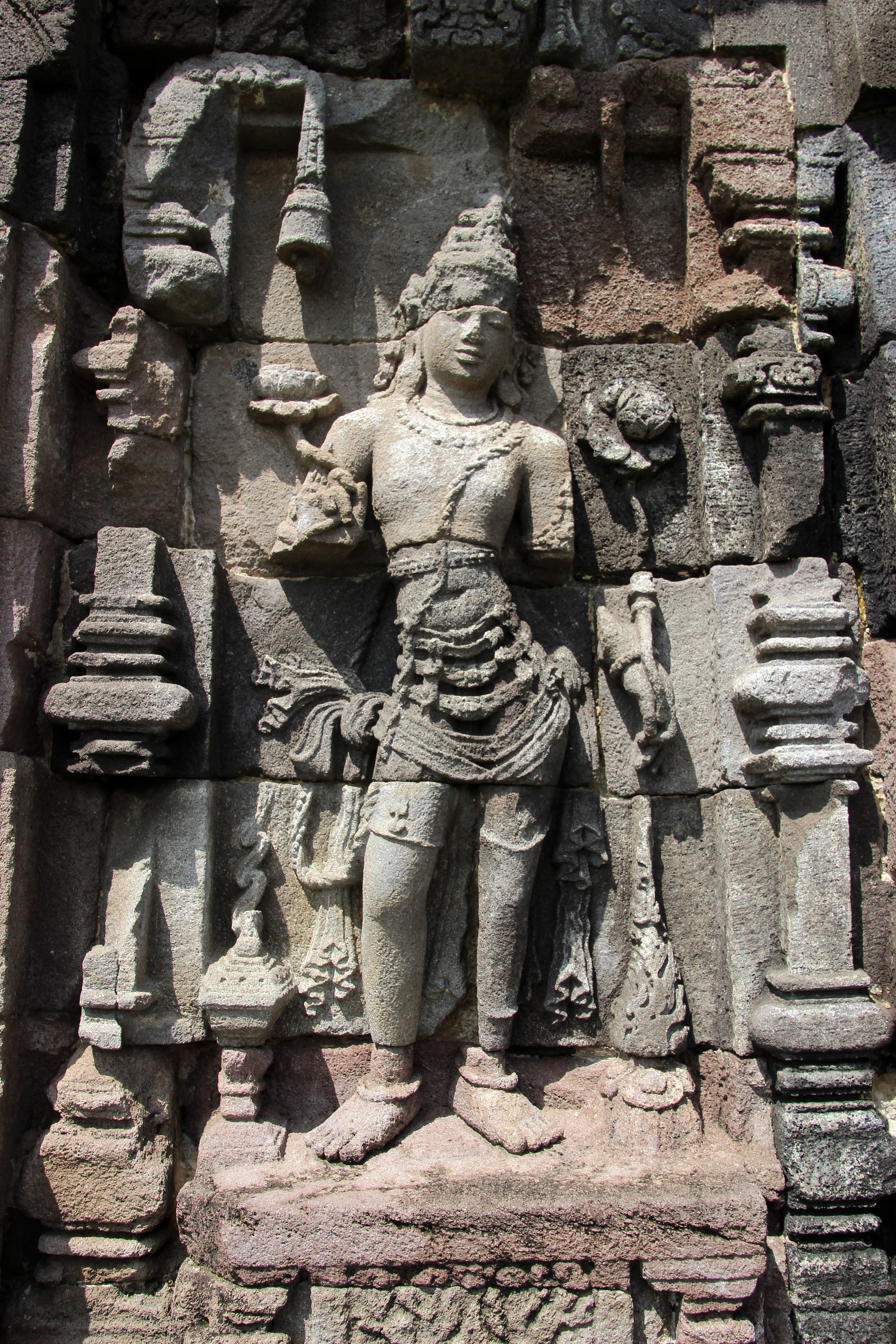
Bodhisattva, Plaosan Buddhist temple, Central Java, 9th century.

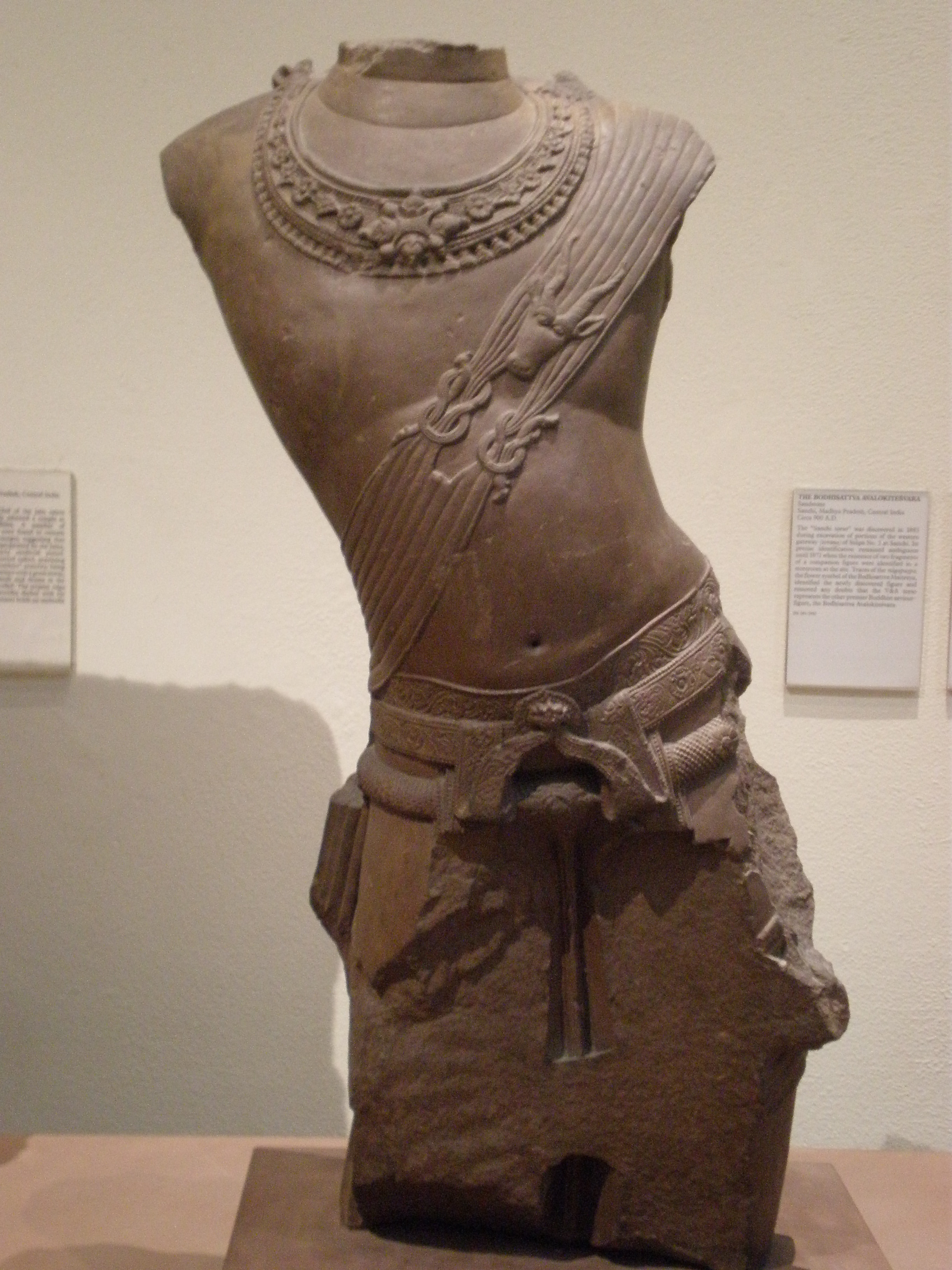
The "Sanchi Torso", c. 900, one of a pair of bodhisattvas flanking a Buddha statue.

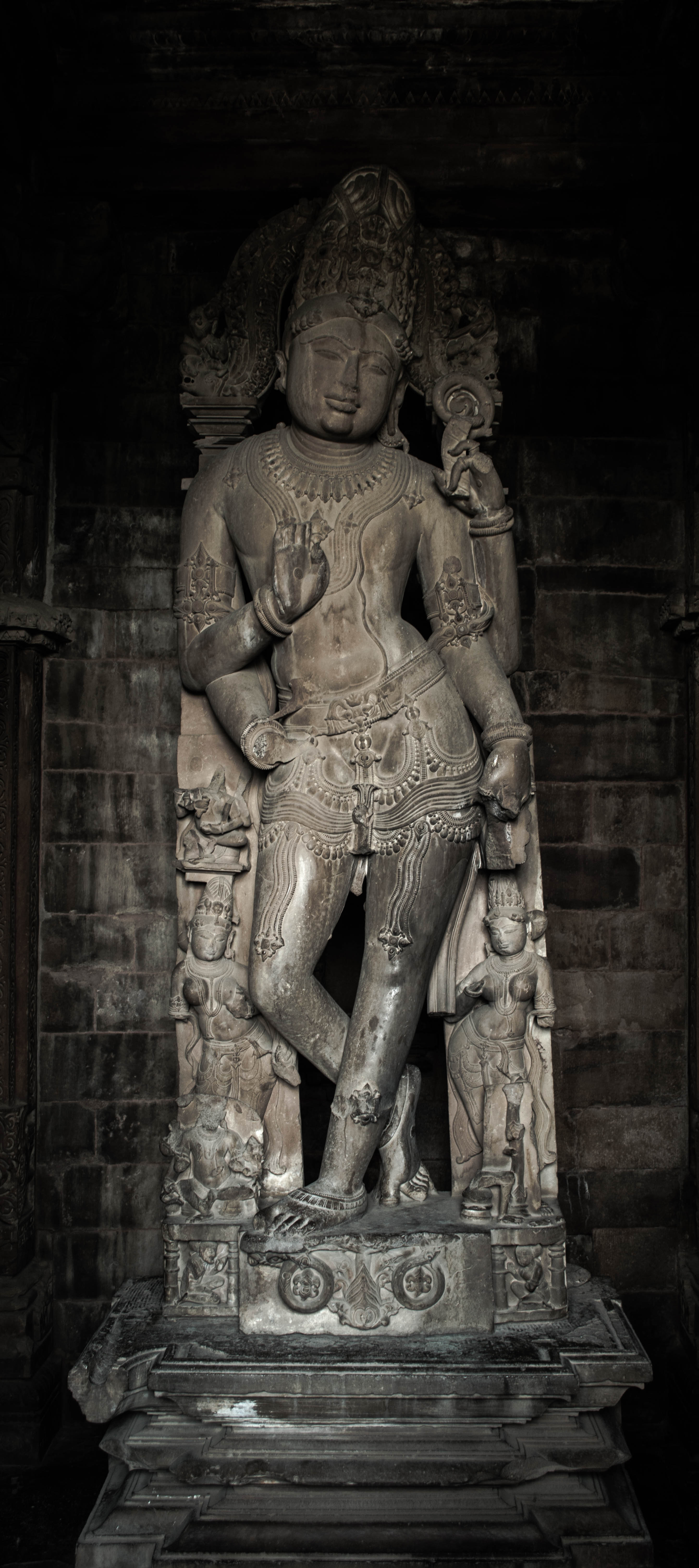
Vishnu at Khajuraho

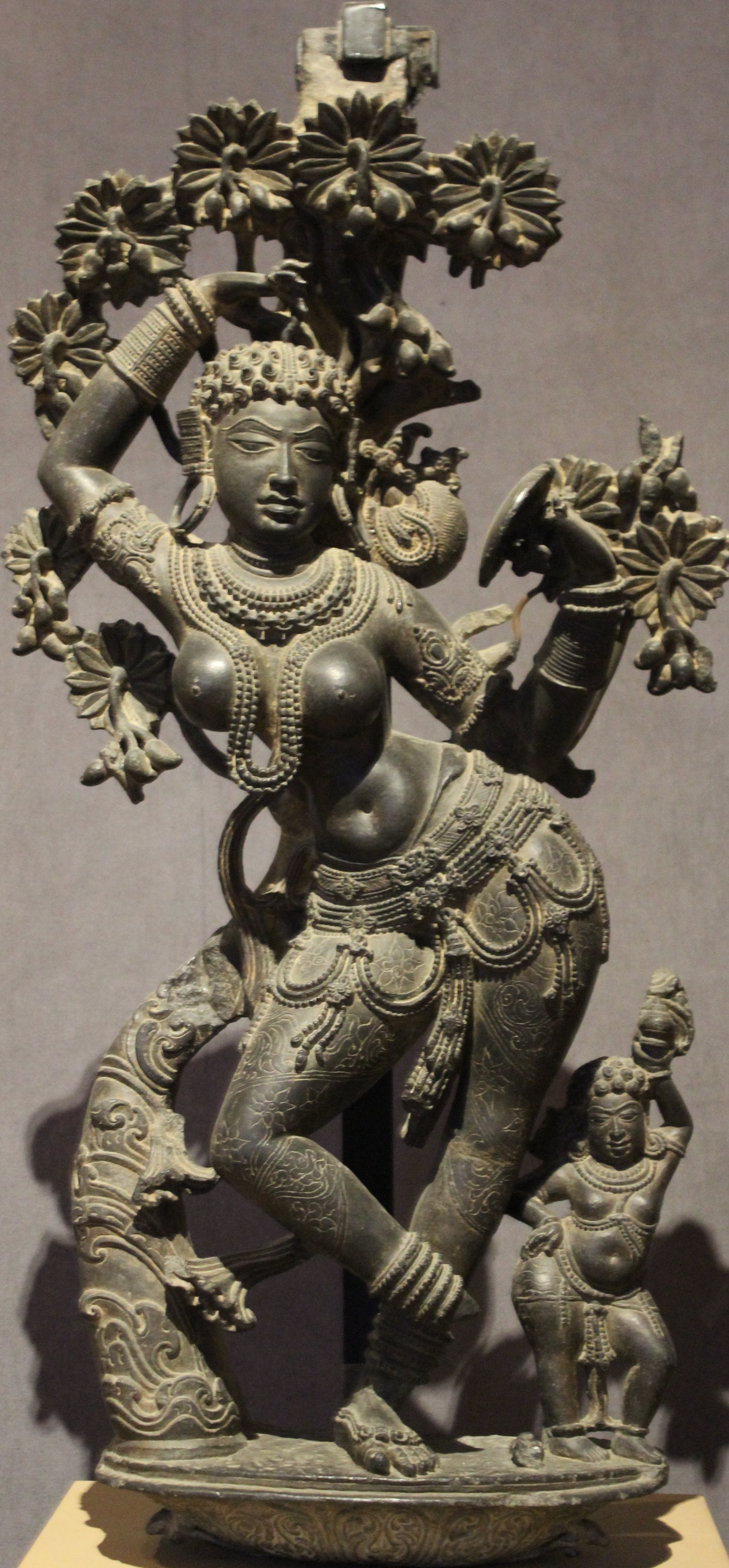
Mohini, 12th century, Western Chalukya dynasty, showing extreme tribhanga

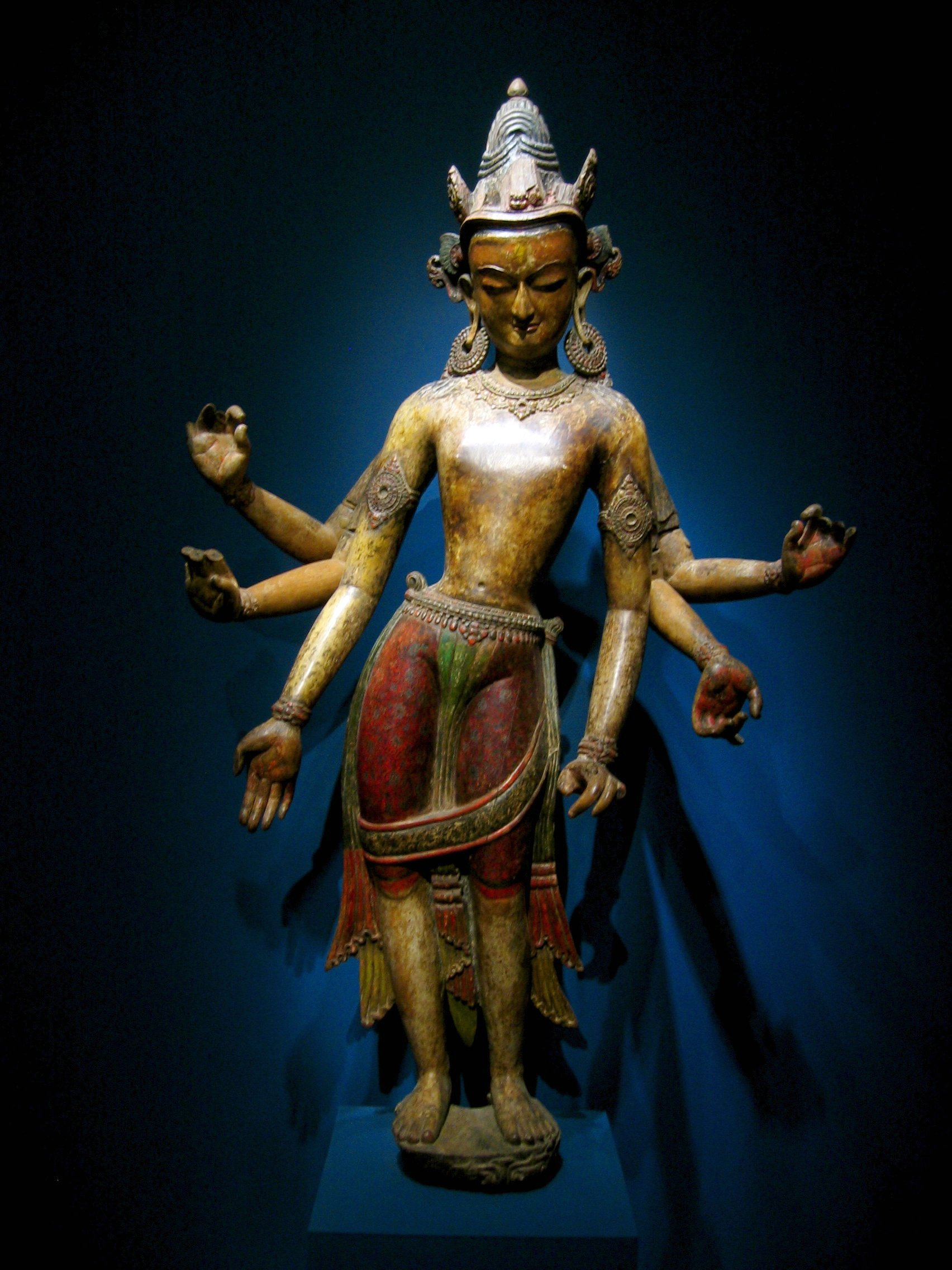
White Avalokiteshvara from Nepal, 14th century

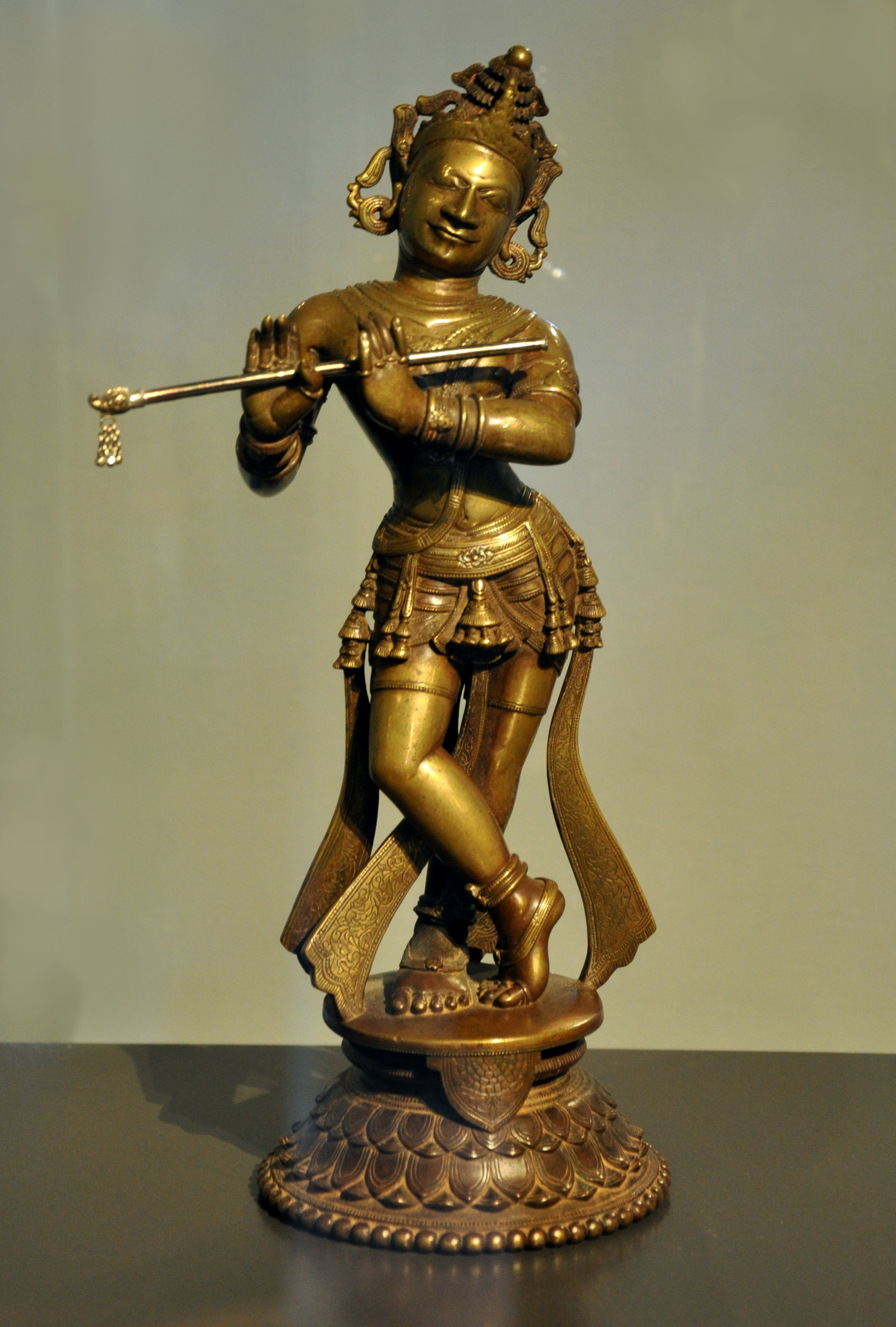
Bronze Krishna playing flute, Odisha, c. 1800

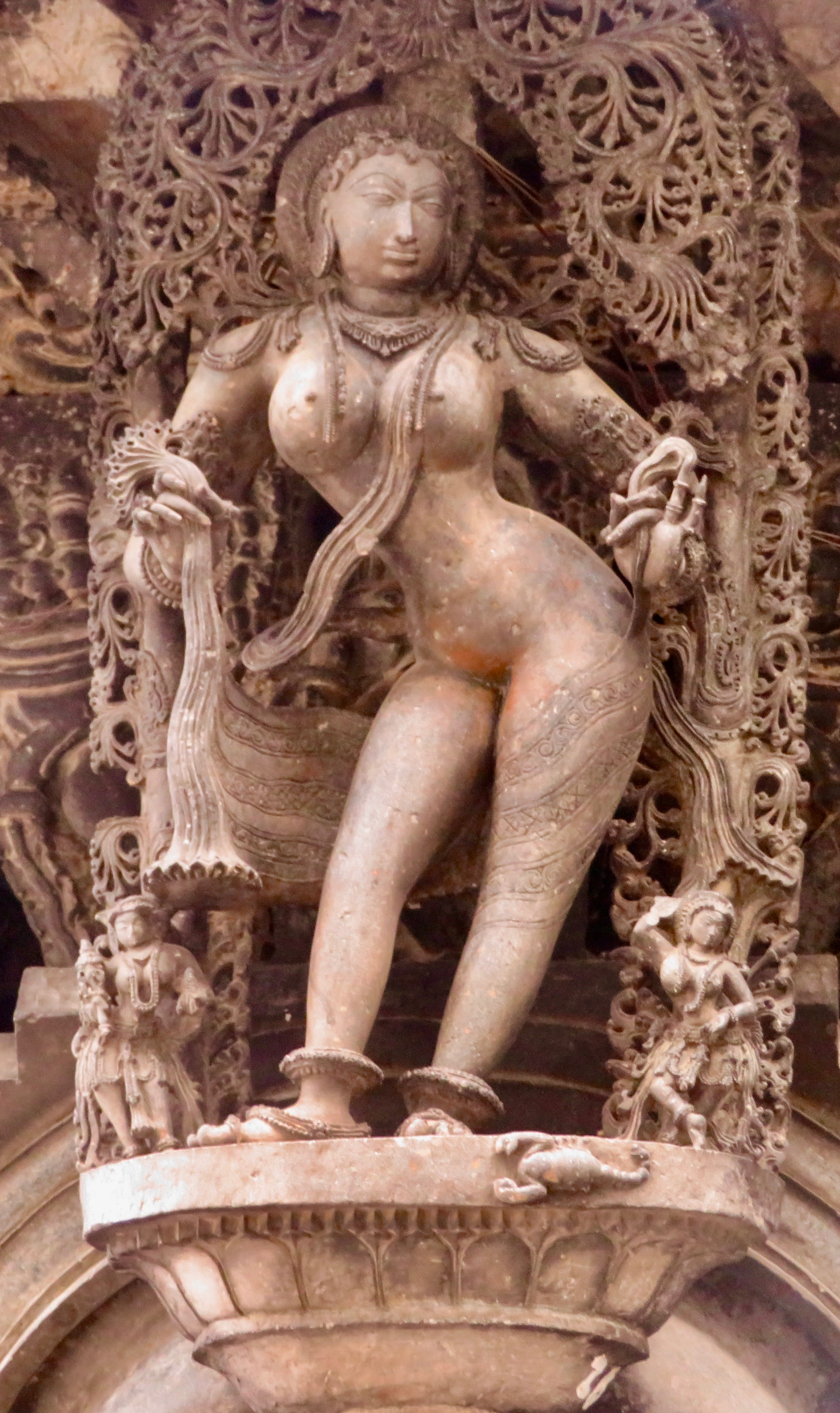
Salabhanjika, Belur, Karnataka, 12th century

== In art ==
Like many other poses used in traditional Indian dance, including Odissi, Bharata Natyam and Kathak, Tribhangi or Tribhanga can be found in Indian sculpture as well. Traditionally the Yakshi is shown with her hand touching a tree branch, and a sinuous pose, tribhanga pose, as is Salabhanjika, whose examples dating to the 12th century can be found in the Hoysala temples of Belur, in south-central Karnataka and the Khajuraho temples built around 9th century CE, where Vishnu is depicted at various places in this position which is commonly reserved for Krishna, playing the flute. The Agamic texts suggest that Shiva sculptures are to be made in tribhanga posture facing the east as seen in temple dating 8th-12th centuries.

The central deity at the Simhachalam temple near Visakhapatnam, the lion-man incarnation of Lord Mahavishnu is in the tribhanga posture. In the back it carries an inscription dating it 1098, the period of the Chola King Kuloththunga. The Tirumala Rama Idol at the famous Tirumala Venkateswara Temple, Andhra Pradesh is also in the same posture. This style has also travels with Indian influence as in China where some sculptures at the Maijishan Grottoes built in the Later Qin era (384-417 CE). Some Buddha images in Thailand are also in the tribhanga (leaning) position and so are some of Boddhisattva in the ancient Yakushi-ji Buddhist temples in Nara, Japan, built in 680 CE, the Hakuhō period. Takkolam pallava period Shiva temple Durga also in Tribhanga style is best example is in Tamil Nadu.

As compared with the similar European contrapposto and "S Curve" poses, the Tribhanga, literally meaning three parts break, consists of three bends in the body; at the neck, waist and knee, hence the body is oppositely curved at waist and neck which gives it a gentle "S" shape. It has been closely associated with the Hindu deity Krishna who is often portrayed in this posture.

== In dance ==
It is considered the most graceful and sensual of the Odissi positions, and used in many other classical Indian dance forms. The Indian classical dance of Odissi is characterized by various Bhangas or stance, which involves stamping of the foot and striking various postures, four in number, namely Bhanga, Abanga, Atibhanga, and Tribhanga being the most common of all. The Sanskrit term Tribhanga means Three Bhanga and according to K. M. Varma the term Tribhanga was in the original Shilpa Shastras literature not the name of a particular standing position but used, contrary to the modern usage in art history, to describe the group of the "Three Bhangas", namely Abhanga, Samabhanga, and Atibhanga.

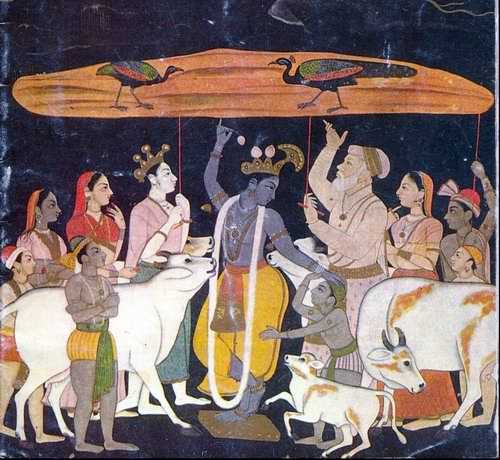
Krishna upholding the Govardhan mountain in the Tribhunga stance

== General and cited references ==
- Berkson, Carmel, The Life of Form in Indian Sculpture, 2000, Abhinav Publications, ISBN 8170173760
- Craven, Roy C. Indian Art: A Concise History, 1987, Thames & Hudson (Praeger in USA), ISBN 0500201463
- Harle, J.C., The Art and Architecture of the Indian Subcontinent, 2nd edn. 1994, Yale University Press Pelican History of Art, ISBN 0300062176
- Masson-Ousel, P., Stern, P., Willman-Grabowska, H., Ancient India and Indian Civilization, 2013 (reprint), Routledge, ISBN 1136200657, 9781136200656, google books
- Rowland, Benjamin, The Art and Architecture of India: Buddhist, Hindu, Jain, 1967 (3rd edn.), Pelican History of Art, Penguin, ISBN 0140561021
