= S-curve (art) =

Composition concept in visual art

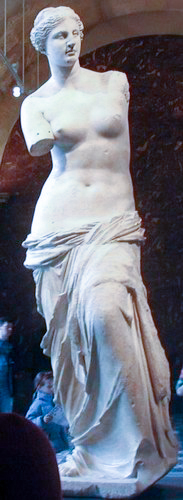
The Venus de Milo statue has an S-curve form.

Diagram S-curve form of Doryphoros by Polykleitos

In the visual arts, an S-curve is an S-shaped curve that serves a wide variety of compositional purposes. The term is usually applied to the standing human figure bending first one way and then back the other. It may also be applied more generally, for example in landscape painting and photography.

== Human figure ==
In Ancient Greek and Roman sculpture, the S-curve is a traditional art concept where the figure's body and posture is depicted like a sinuous or serpentine manner. It is related to and is an extension of the art term of contrapposto which is when a figure is depicted slouching or placing one's weight and thus center of gravity to one side. However, the S Curve involves more of the body than the contrapposto, and is therefore considered to be a more advanced technical development. The "S Curve" concept was probably invented by the famous Greek sculptor Praxiteles, son of Kifissodotos, who lived in the 4th century BC.

The Indian tribhanga ("three bend") pose is similar, but generally more pronounced, often with the neck also curved to one side. This goes back to at least 100 BC. The S-curve was revived in Gothic art from the 14th century onwards, especially in sculptures of the Madonna. Gothic figures in ivory, typically of the Madonna, had already acquired a "Gothic sway" to one side to fit into the curved tusk, and curving the head or upper body back the other gave a more satisfactory result.

The figura serpentinata is a variant or development of the pose. The term is usually applied only to art from the Renaissance onwards, and Donatello is often regarded as its inventor. While in all these periods the S-curve originated in sculpture, it was also used in two-dimensional figures in various other media.

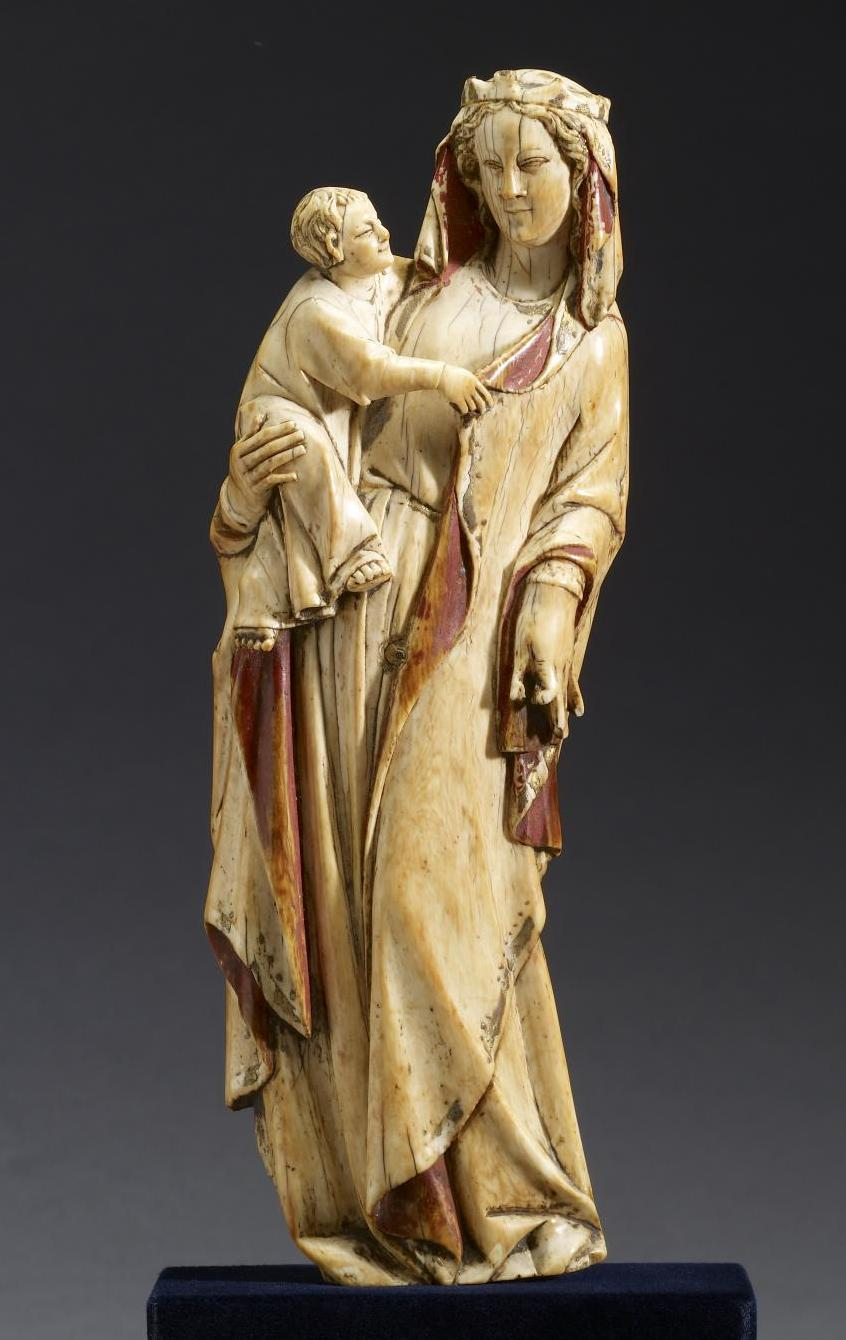
Madonna and Child, German, 14th-century

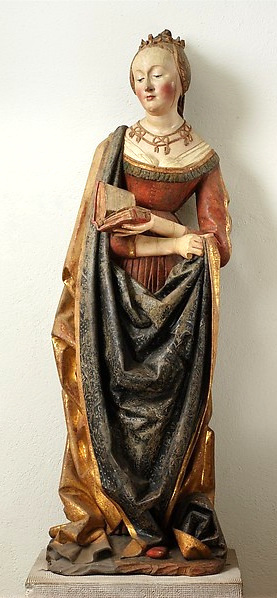
Saint Barbara, German (?), 1490

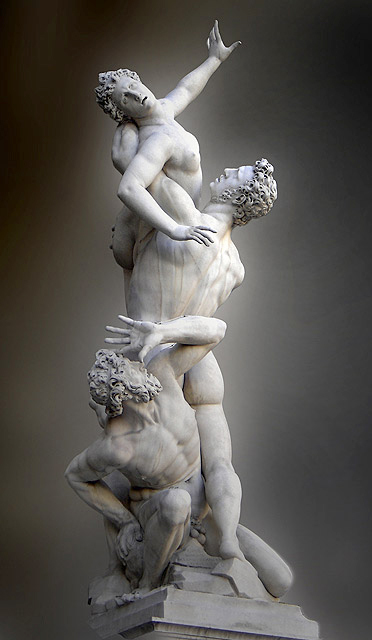
Abduction of a Sabine Woman, 1579–1583. Loggia dei Lanzi, Florence

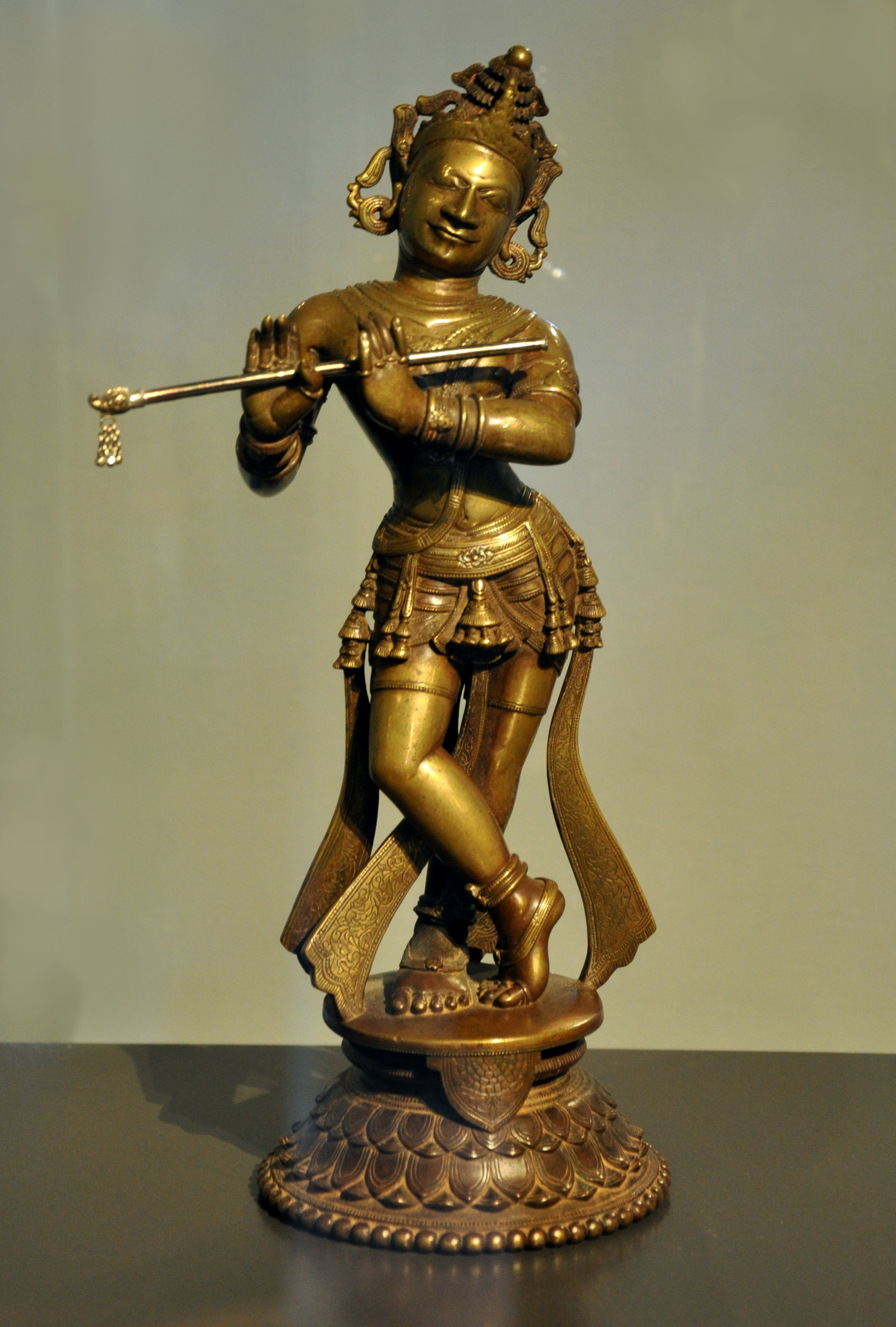
Indian tribhanga ("three bend") posed bronze Krishna playing flute, Odisha, c. 1800

== Landscape ==
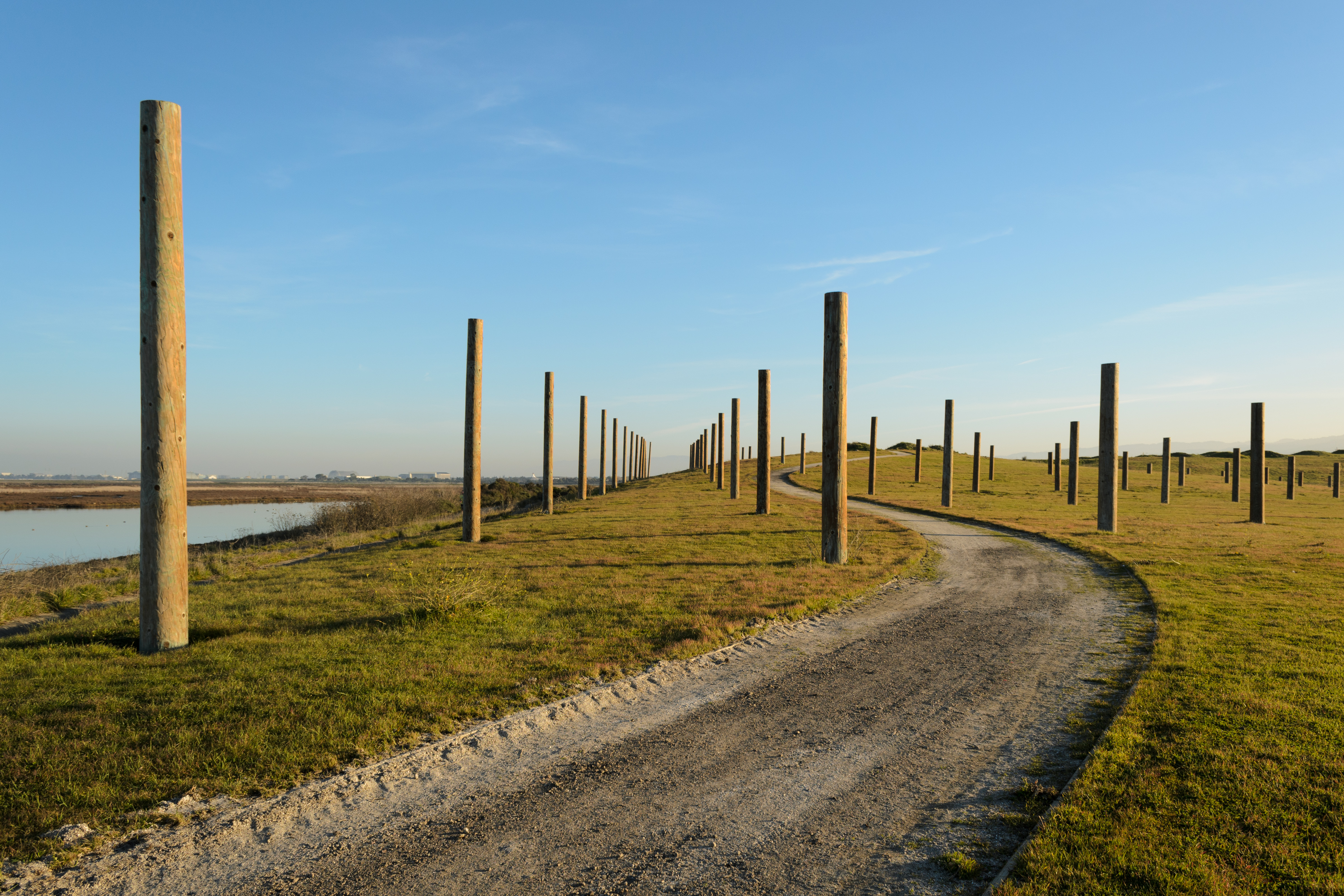
An S-curve meanders into the distance in this photograph of a dirt path in the Palo Alto Baylands Nature Preserve.

An S-curve can help guide the viewer's eye through the image to the main subject at the end of the curve, but can also serve as a subject in and of itself. It has been variously described as dynamic, feminine, restful, and hypnotic. The S-curve is particularly prominent in a vertical composition, where it may be stacked to form a double S-curve for maximum effect.
