= Cloisters Apocalypse =

C. 1330 French illuminated manuscript

- New York, Cloisters Apocalypse, MS 68.174
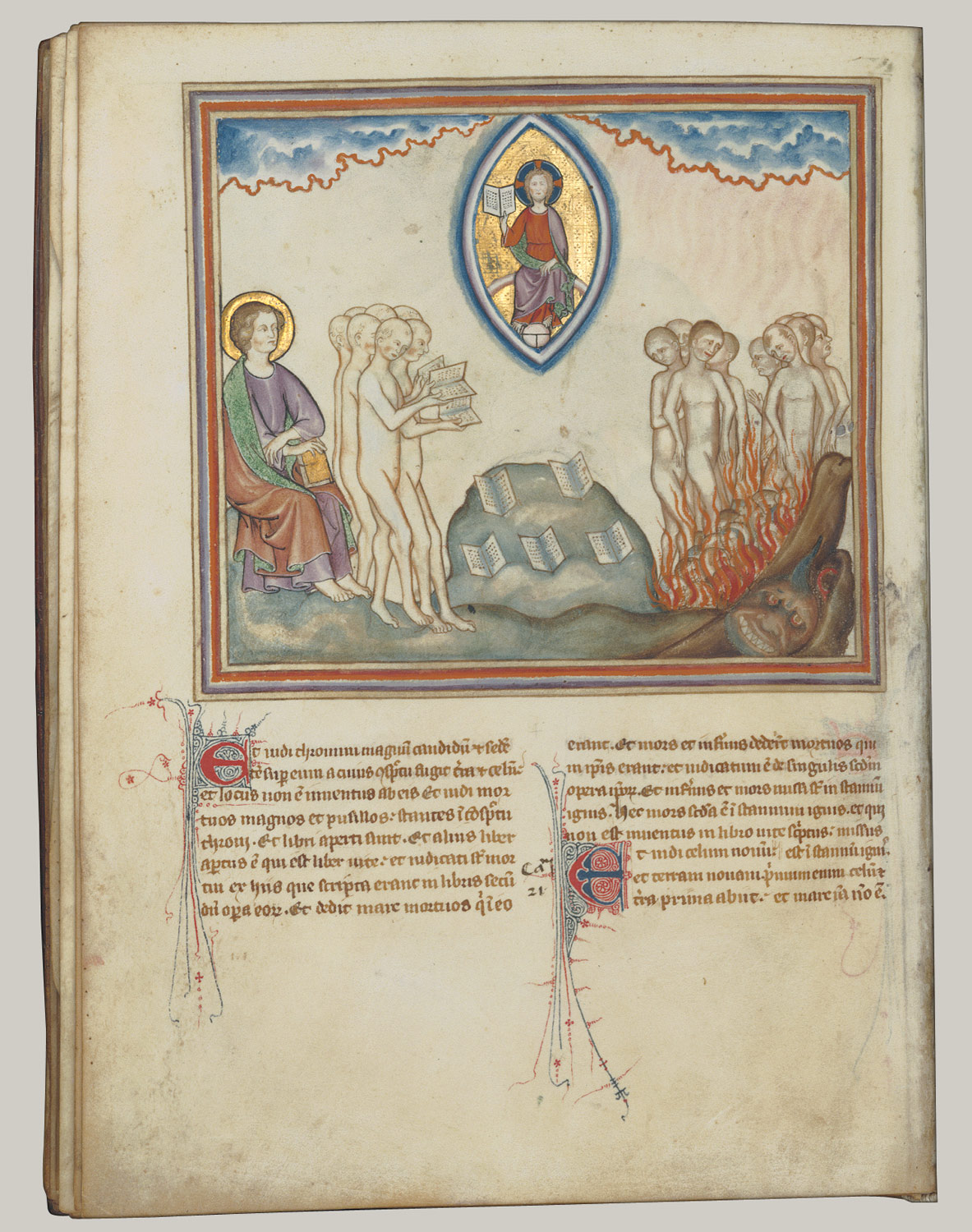
- Cloisters Apocalypse, f. 35v: The Last Judgment
- Type: Apocalypse
- Date: c. 1330
- Place of origin: Normandy
- Language: Latin
- Material: Parchment, ink, tempera, gold, silver
- Size: 308 × 230 mm
- Format: 2 columns
- Illumination(s): 72 half or full-page miniatures. Coats of arms. Decorated initials in red & blue.
- Previously kept: Switzerland, possibly Abbey of Zofingen
- Accession: no. 68.174

The Cloisters Apocalypse, MS 68.174 is a French illuminated manuscript dated c. 1330, now in The Cloisters in New York. There are 40 folios, that is to say, 80 pages. The page size is 12 1/8 × 9 1/16 in. (30.8 × 23 cm). There is a high level of illustration, with 72 half or full-page miniatures, as well as coats of arms and decorated initials in red & blue.

The text is the Book of Revelation, part of the New Testament. It was thought in the Middle Ages to be authored by John the Evangelist, and contains visions of the end of the world and apocalyptic revelations. According to Christian tradition John was exiled c. 95 CE to the Aegean island of Patmos, where he wrote his text, which describes his despair and isolation while exiled, and his prophecy of the events and terrors of the last days.

It has been claimed that the manuscript was probably influenced by the Commentary on the Apocalypse (c. 776) by the Spanish abbot Beatus of Liébana, who collected earlier commentators on Revelation for an early medieval context, when the end of the world was anticipated. But unlike the Morgan Beatus, also in New York, it is not one of the group of Iberian Beatus manuscripts with very distinctive illustrations, apparently dating back to the 8th-century creation of the work.

== Style and attribution ==
In form and style, the manuscript resembles two other books created in Normandy c. 1320–1330: the British Library Add MS 17333, an Apocalypse manuscript known as the "Val-Dieu Apocalypse", and Bibliothèque nationale de France, MS lat. 14410: the "Apocalypse of Saint-Victor". All three were produced on the continent, but based on late 13th century English sources, probably another manuscript such as the "Lambeth Apocalypse" (London, Lambeth Palace, MS 209). The latter manuscript contains a number of details closely resembling those in the "Cloisters Apocalypse", which is thought to be the common source for all three.

The Cloisters book differs from the others in the group in one important aspect; it begins with a preliminary cycle from the childhood of Jesus.

== Text ==
The Book of Revelation is now thought to be the work of a shadowy figure called John of Patmos, rather than the apostle and evangelist. A significant part of the Revelation text is now missing from the Cloisters MS, from chapter 16:14 to 20:3, but later unillustrated text on paper (rather than vellum) has been added, probably in the 15th century, to replace the missing part (folios 39 and 40).

The book opens with God and the Seven Angels instructing and prophesying the bishops of Seven churches of Asia to conquer and spread the word of the Holy Spirit. These episodes are followed by incidents from John's life and travels, especially his exile on the island of Patmos.

== Miniatures ==
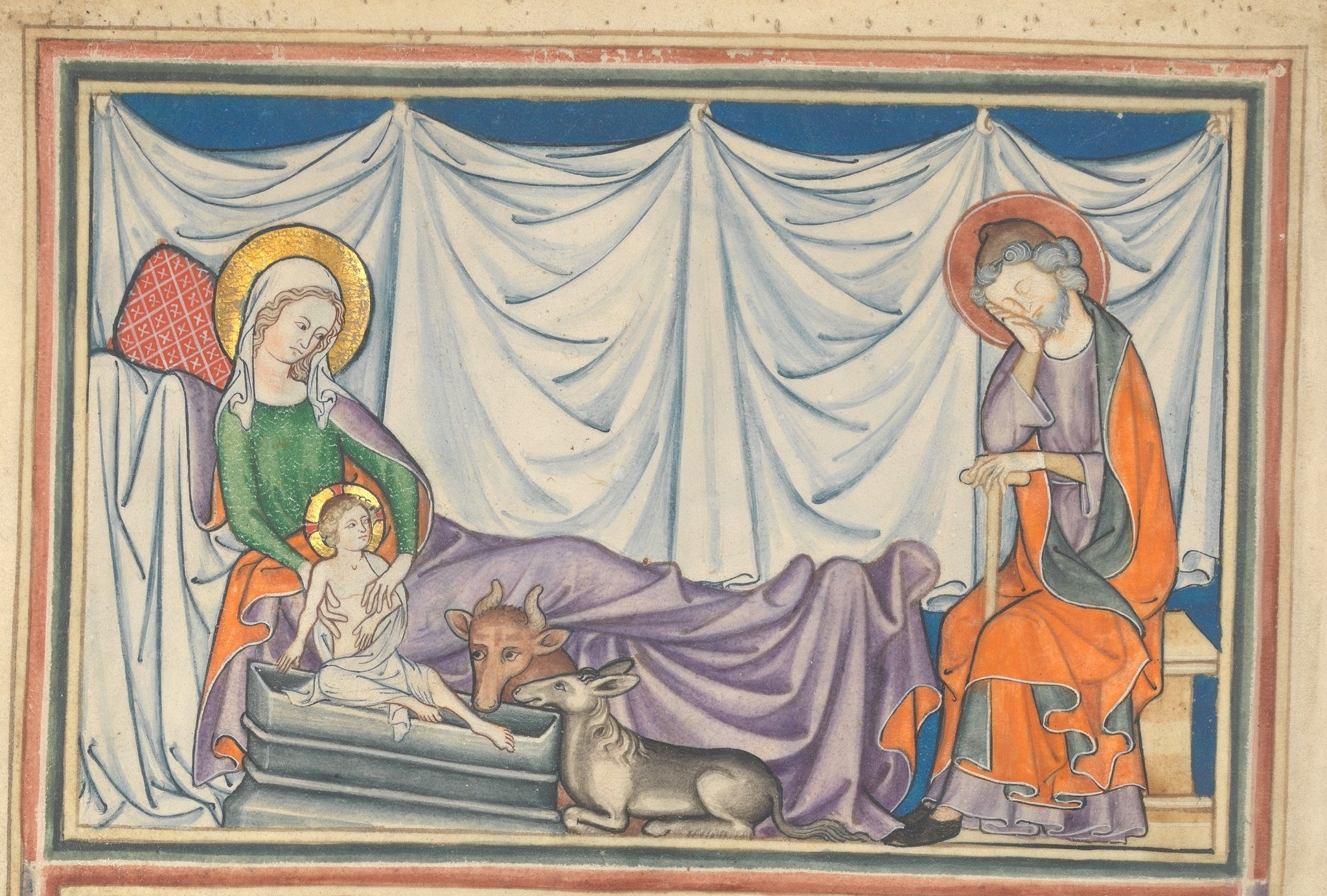
Nativity scene from the prefatory cycle

In total there are miniatures on 72 pages, a very high level. Most share the page with text, typically at the top of the page, occupying rather more than half the height of it. The book begins with a set of scenes from the early life of Christ, with no text. There are eight scenes in landscape format, two to a page. They cover from the Annunciation to the Flight into Egypt.

Throughout there are multiple heraldic shields, although many are badly damaged or faded; these suggest an origin in Normandy. The book contains 72 half or full page miniature illustrations, most of which are courtly in the early 14th century style, although the borders of the leaves are richly detailed. Folio 9 verso contains six armorial shields on the border of an altar cloth. In keeping with a book of revelations, contain scenes of pessimism and violence, while miniatures show a bleeding Christ by a tree. The marginalia contains grotesque beasts and daemons. These depictions include fragments of altar tables and doves, with the Souls of the Dead, martyrs, and crucifixion trees.

Overall the book takes a soft approach to John's revelations, with the illuminations mainly in the soft style, and courtly, typically Gothic, scenes of domesticity interspersing with darker figures, but all painted in a manner influenced with Spanish art of the period.

The later miniatures mostly emphasise John's proximity and bond with Jesus.

=== Four Horsemen ===
A number of miniatures detail the Four Horsemen of the Apocalypse, individually and in groups. The knightly saints are identified through the colour mainly associated with them; St. George rides a white horse (associated with a royal steed), St. Theodore, holding the scales of famine, sits on a "gloomy" black horse, and St. Demetrius a red horse, (associated with the colour of blood). The fourth horseman, Death, rides a pale horse, traditionally "the color of decay", according to art historian Helmut Nickel.

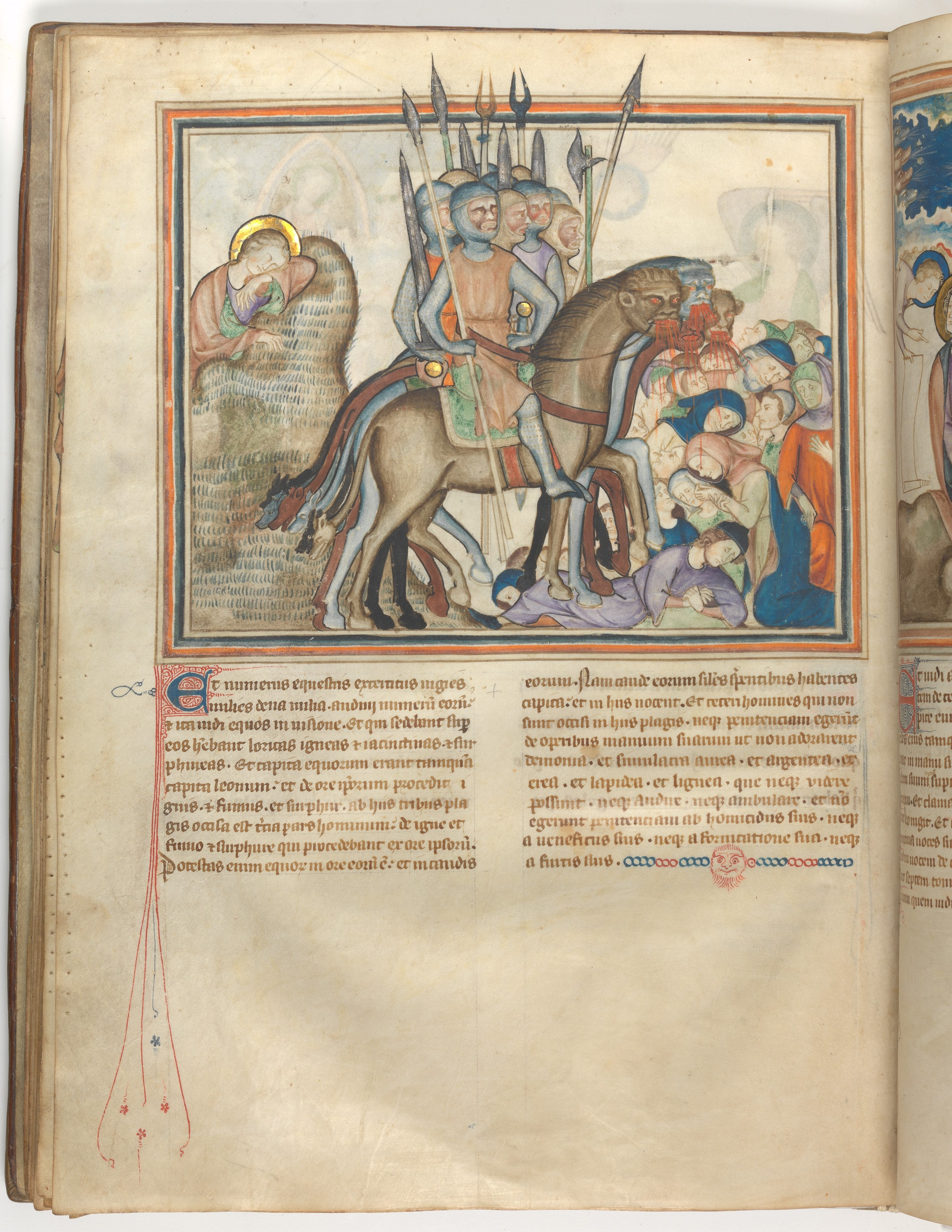
Army of the Horsemen

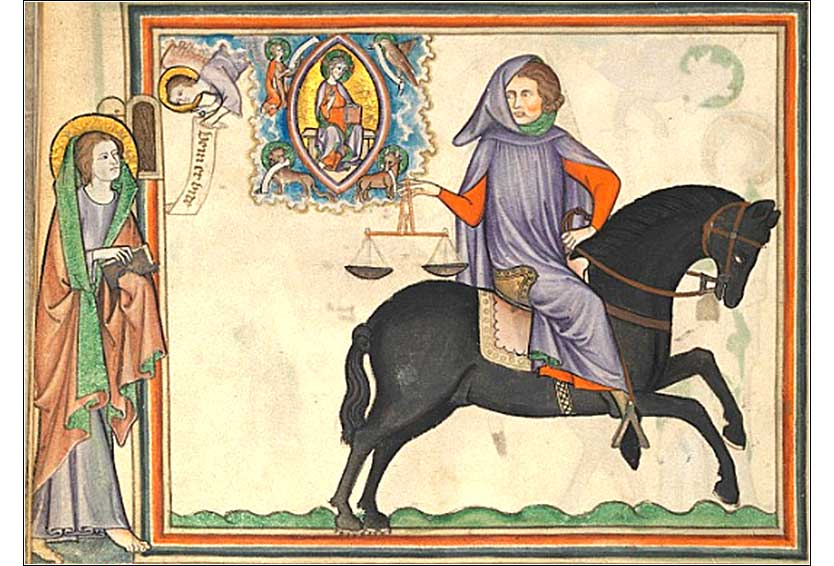
Third Horseman, St. Theodore

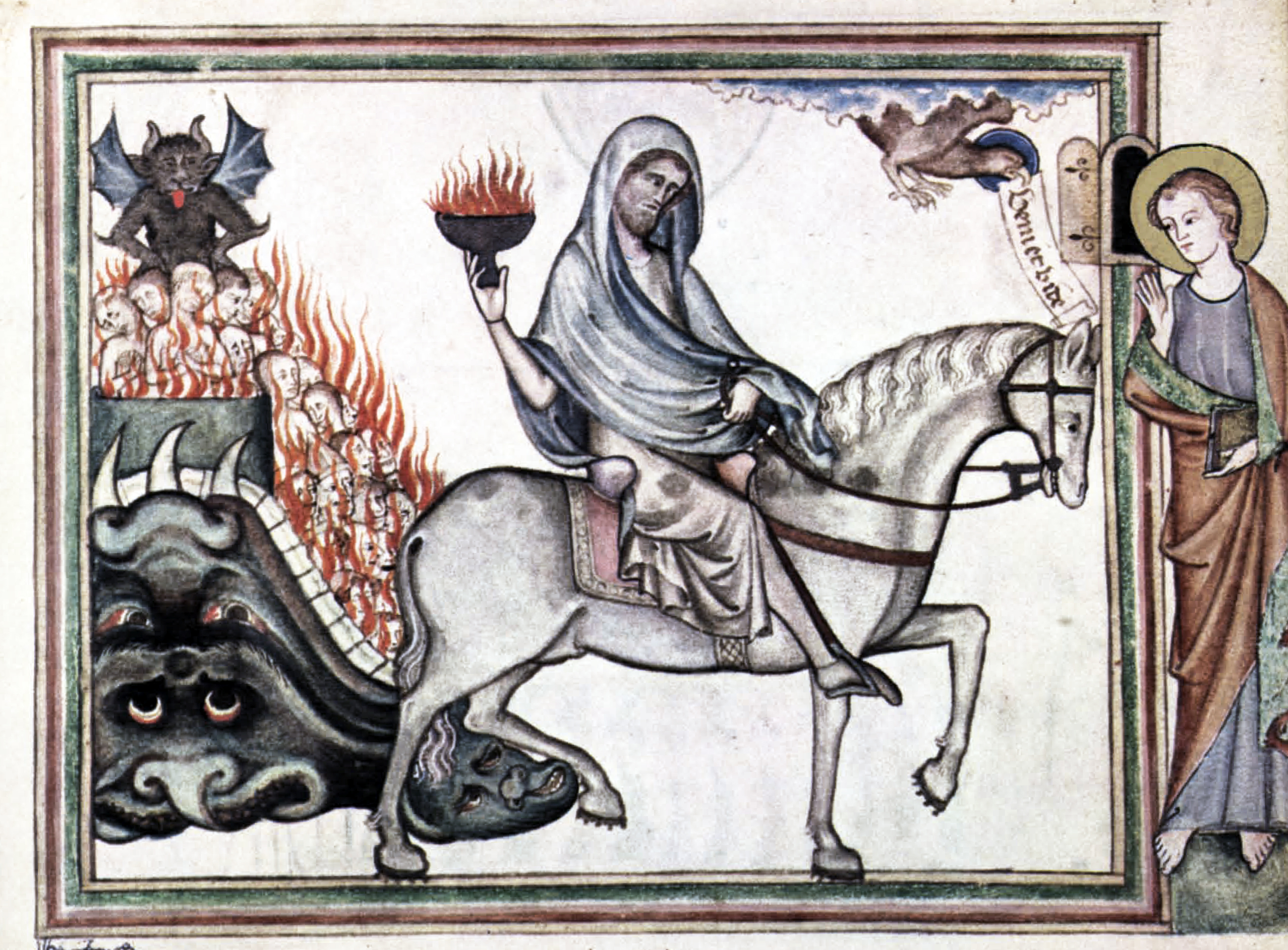
Fourth Horseman, Death

== Provenance ==
A coat of arms illustrated on one of the leaves suggests it was commissioned by a member of the de Montigny family of Coutances, Normandy. Stylistically it resembles other Norman illuminated books, as well as some designs on stained glass, of the period. The book was in Switzerland by 1368, possibly at the abbey of Zofingen, in the canton of Aargau. It was acquired by the Metropolitan Museum of Art in 1968.

== Gallery ==
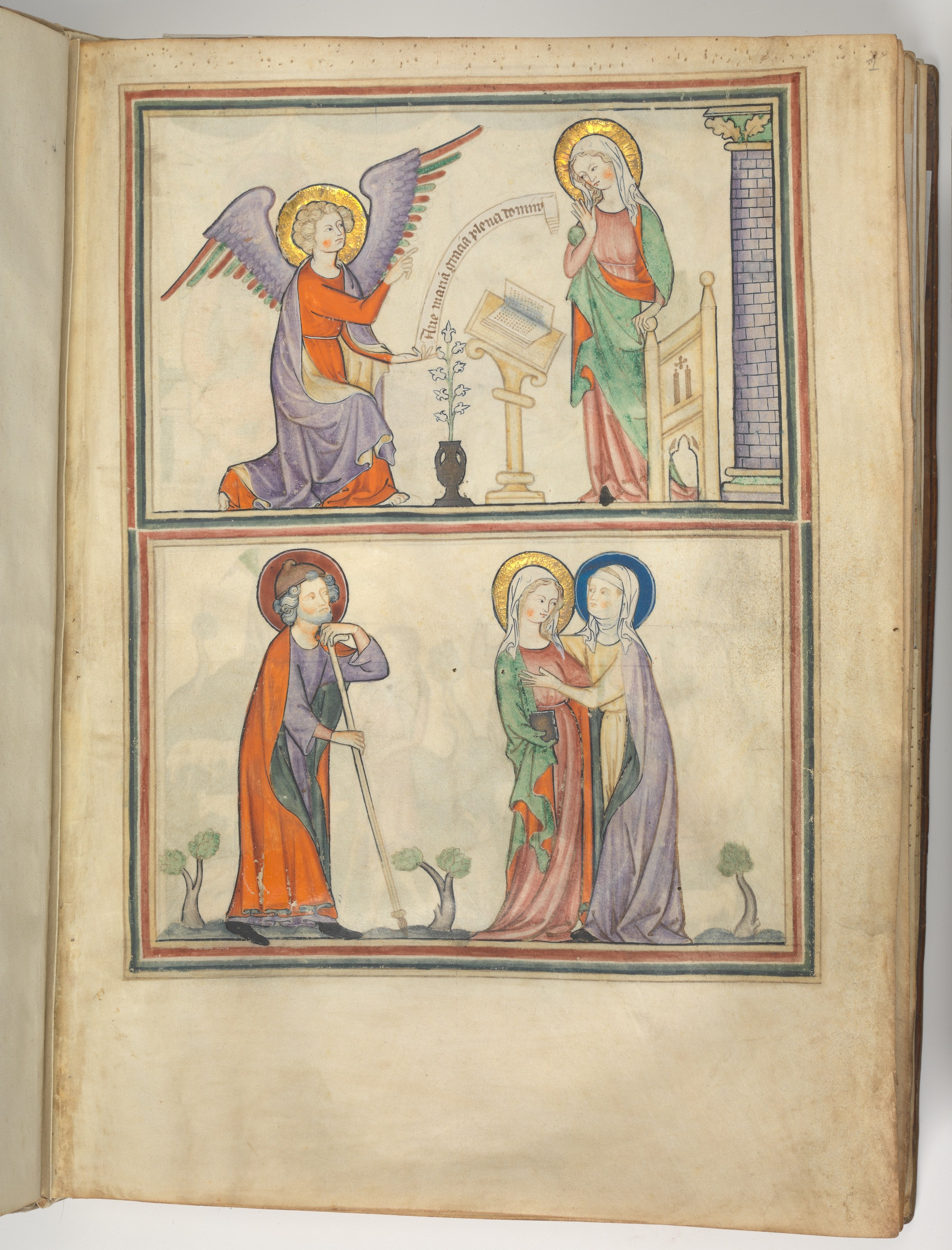
Annunciation and Visitation, folio 1r

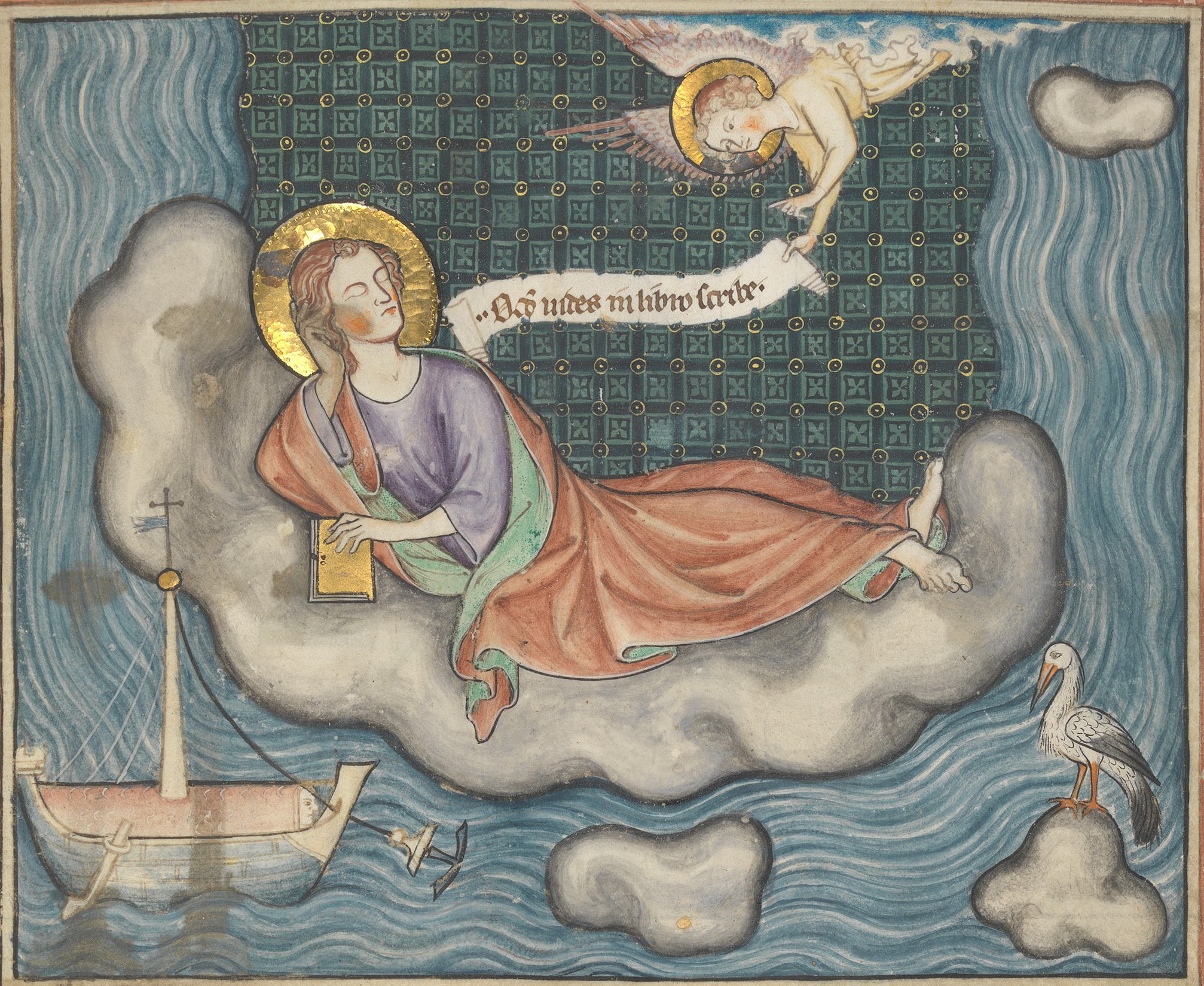
John on the Island of Patmos, folio 3r

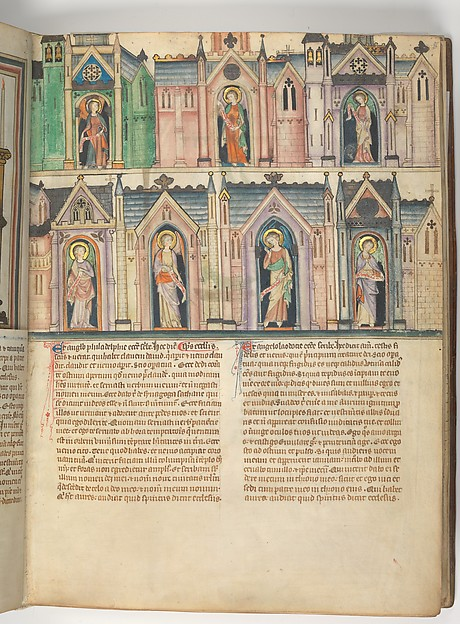
The Seven Churches and the Seven Angels, folio 5r

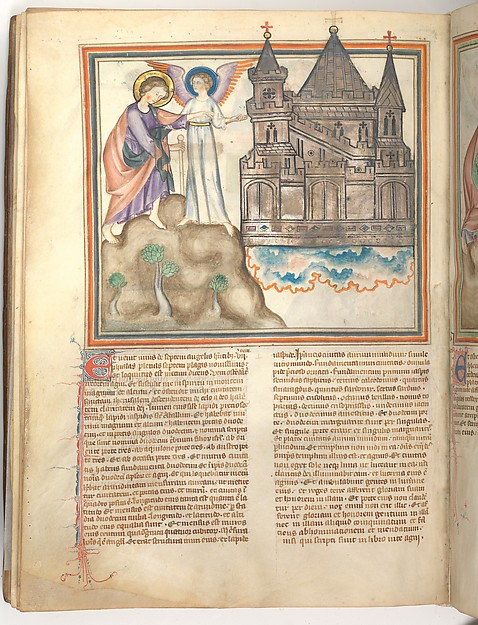
John Led to the New Jerusalem, folio 6v

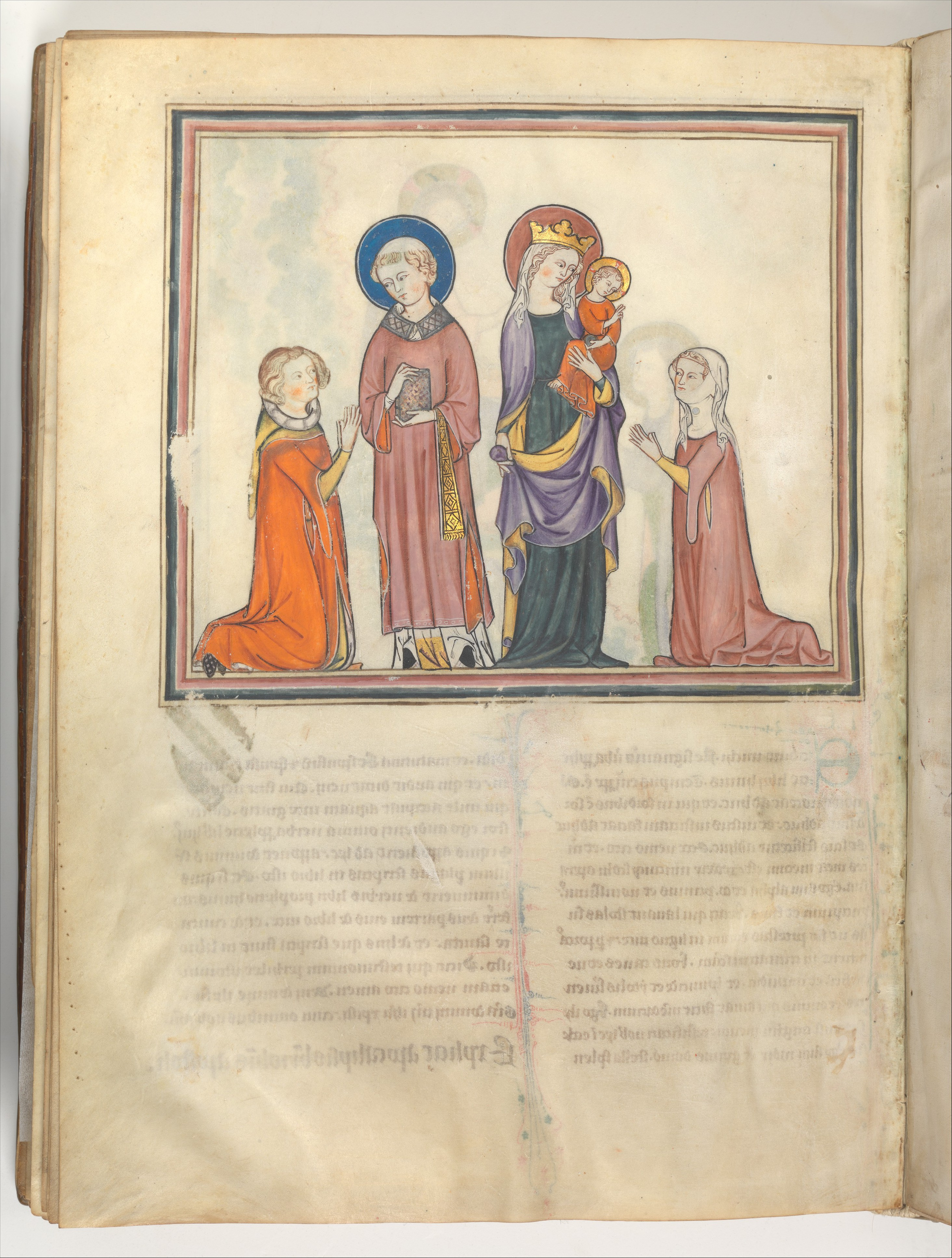
Saint John and Virgin with Donors, folio 38v

== Sources ==
- Deuchler & Hoffeld, The Cloisters Apocalypse: Commentaries on an early fourteenth-century Manuscript, by Florens Deuchler, Jeffrey Hoffeld, Helmut Nickel, 1971, Metropolitan Museum of Art, online
