= Saint Barbara (The Cloisters) =

15th-century sculpture, possibly German

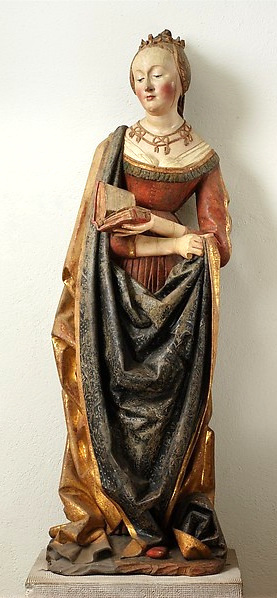
Limewood with paint, Metropolitan Museum of Art

Saint Barbara is a sculpture statuette in limewood with paint, completed by an unknown, probably German, artist in Strasbourg, Alsace, in present-day France, around 1490. This representation of the early Christian martyr Saint Barbara is today in the collection of the Metropolitan Museum of Art, New York. It was commissioned as a fitting as part of for the high altarpiece of the Saint Mauritius church, near Strasbourg. Some of the painted wings and figures of this central shrine have survived, allowing art historians to propose a possible reconstruction, usually with this work as one of the two outermost figures. Lost sculptures, but known from record include those of Saint Maurice, Pope Gregory the Great, while the central figure was a standing Virgin and Child.

The modeling and colourisation is of the first quality, completed in the then popular monumental style. The model seems refined and aristocratic, and is dressed in high fashion. Her red dress, which is highly detailed, but very large drapery fold, is molded and contains gilt wax brocade patterns. She is intelligent looking and obviously educated, she hold a book outstretched before her. In style, the work seems influenced by the late Gothic work of Nikolaus Gerhaert.

== Sources ==
- Barnet, Peter; Nancy Wu. "The Cloisters: Medieval Art and Architecture". New York and New Haven: The Metropolitan Museum of Art, 2005
- Wixom, William. "Medieval Sculpture at The Cloisters". The Metropolitan Museum of Art Bulletin, volume 46, no. 3, Winter, 1988–1989
