= Bard-lès-Époisses =

- Commune
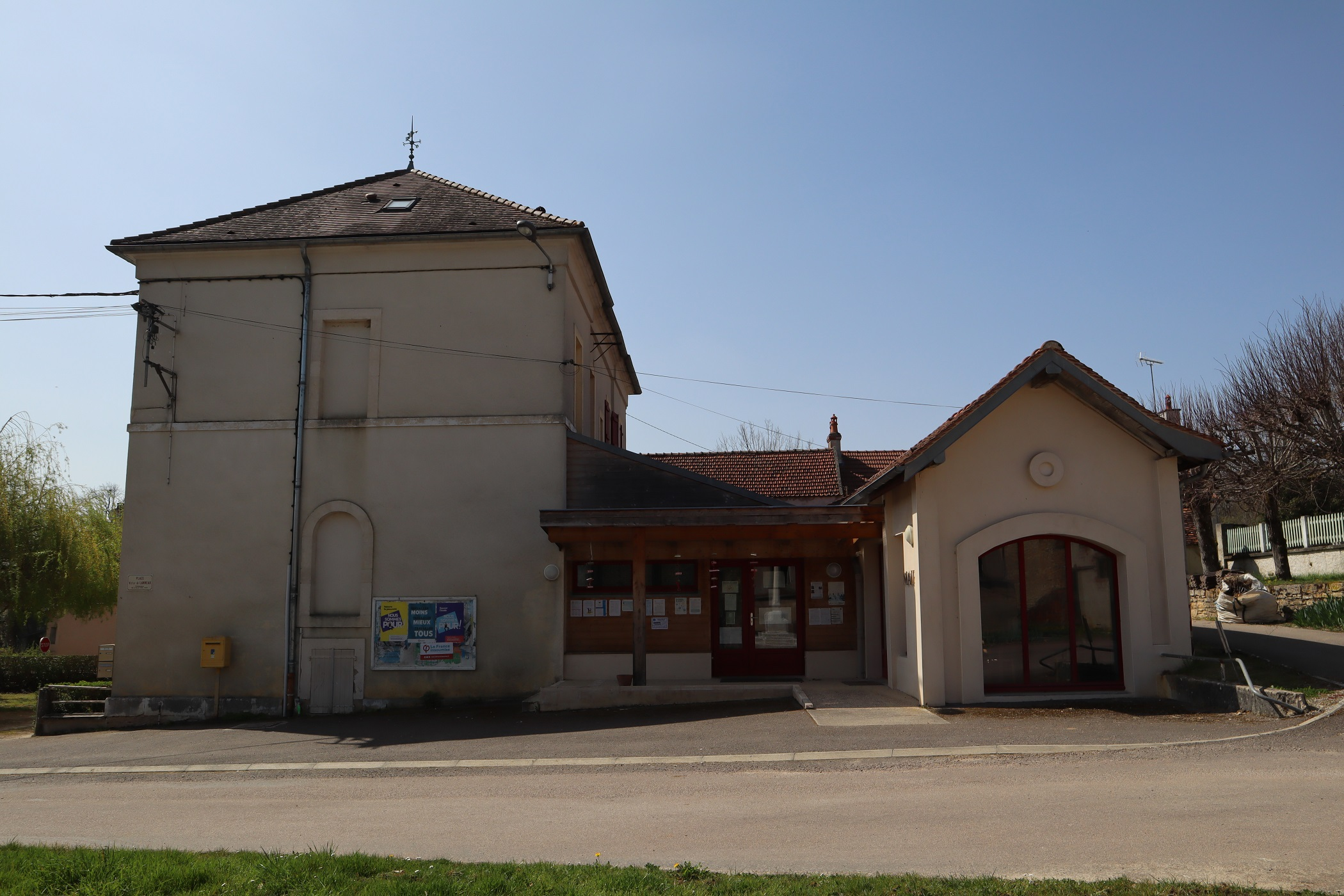
- Town hall

- Coat of arms
- Location of Bard-lès-Époisses
- Location within France Location within Bourgogne-Franche-Comté
- Coordinates: 47°31′56″N 4°13′00″E
- Country: France
- Region: Bourgogne-Franche-Comté
- Department: Côte-d'Or
- Arrondissement: Montbard
- Canton: Semur-en-Auxois

Government
  - Mayor (2020–2026): Jean-Michel Massé
- Area^{1}: 3.54 km^{2} (1.37 sq mi)
- Elevation: 247 m (810 ft)
- Highest elevation: 365 m (1,198 ft)
- Lowest elevation: 228 m (748 ft)
- Population (2023): 72
  - Density: 20/km^{2} (53/sq mi)
- Time zone: UTC+01:00 (CET)
  - Summer (DST): UTC+02:00 (CEST)
- INSEE/Postal code: 21047 /21460
- ^{1} French Land Register data, which excludes lakes, ponds, glaciers > 1 km^{2} (0.386 sq mi or 247 acres) and river estuaries.

Bard-lès-Époisses (French pronunciation: [baʁ lɛ.z‿epwas], literally Bard near Époisses) is a commune in the Côte-d'Or department in the Bourgogne-Franche-Comté region of eastern France.

== Geography ==
Bard-lès-Époisses is located some 14 km south-west of Montbard and 5 km north-east of Époisses. Access to the commune is by the D4 road from Athie in the north-east which passes through the heart of the commune and the village and continues south-west to Corrombles. The D4H comes from Corsaint in the west and passes through the length of the commune, intersecting the D4 in the village, and continues east to join the D4M south-west of Jeux-lès-Bard. Apart from some forest in the north the commune is almost entirely farmland.

The Ru d'Acier stream flows through the east of the commune from south-west to north-east and continues to join the Ruisseau de la Prée north-east of Jeux-lès-Bard.

== History ==
For many centuries the commune was called Bar.

Bar was an annex of Torcy with its patron Saint Matthew. Attached to the diocese of Langres, the parish had 3 parts: Bar, Jeux (formerly Jox and Jovum), and a portion of Corrombles called the Rue de Bar. The parish had 300 communicants. The Lord was the bishop of Langres then the abbot of Moutiers-Saint-Jean to whom the church was given in 1141. The Town Hall fief was given to Charles Lanneau de Marey, Knight of Saint Louis. Among the older families there are the Drouhin. P. Drouhin was Châtelain of Vieux-Château in 1409.

Bard-lès-Époisses appears as Bard on the 1750 Cassini Map and the same on the 1790 version.

== Administration ==
List of Successive Mayors

| From | To | Name |
|---|---|---|
| 2001 | 2026 | Jean Michel Massé |

== Demography ==
The inhabitants of the commune are known as Barrois or Barroises in French.

Historical population

| Year | Pop. | ±% p.a. |
|---|---|---|
| 1793 | 538 | — |
| 1821 | 200 | −3.47% |
| 1846 | 190 | −0.20% |
| 1872 | 155 | −0.78% |
| 1901 | 142 | −0.30% |
| 1926 | 97 | −1.51% |
| 1946 | 82 | −0.84% |
| 1962 | 91 | +0.65% |
| 1968 | 95 | +0.72% |

| Year | Pop. | ±% p.a. |
|---|---|---|
| 1975 | 90 | −0.77% |
| 1982 | 72 | −3.14% |
| 1990 | 66 | −1.08% |
| 1999 | 67 | +0.17% |
| 2007 | 76 | +1.59% |
| 2012 | 53 | −6.96% |
| 2017 | 70 | +5.72% |
| 2023 | 72 | +0.47% |

Source: EHESS and INSEE

== Economy ==
The hill slopes were covered with vines in the early 20th century but the rural exodus and the consequent reduction in population led the remaining farmers to focus their activity on livestock grazing and mixed farming in the plains, leaving the hills area mostly fallow.

== Notable people linked to the commune ==
- Étienne Bouhot (8 August 1780 – 17 July 1862), painter, was born in the commune.
- Victor de Lanneau (25 December 1758 – 1830), defrocked priest and teacher, was born in the commune.

== See also ==
- Communes of the Côte-d'Or department
