= Aisy cendré =

French cheese

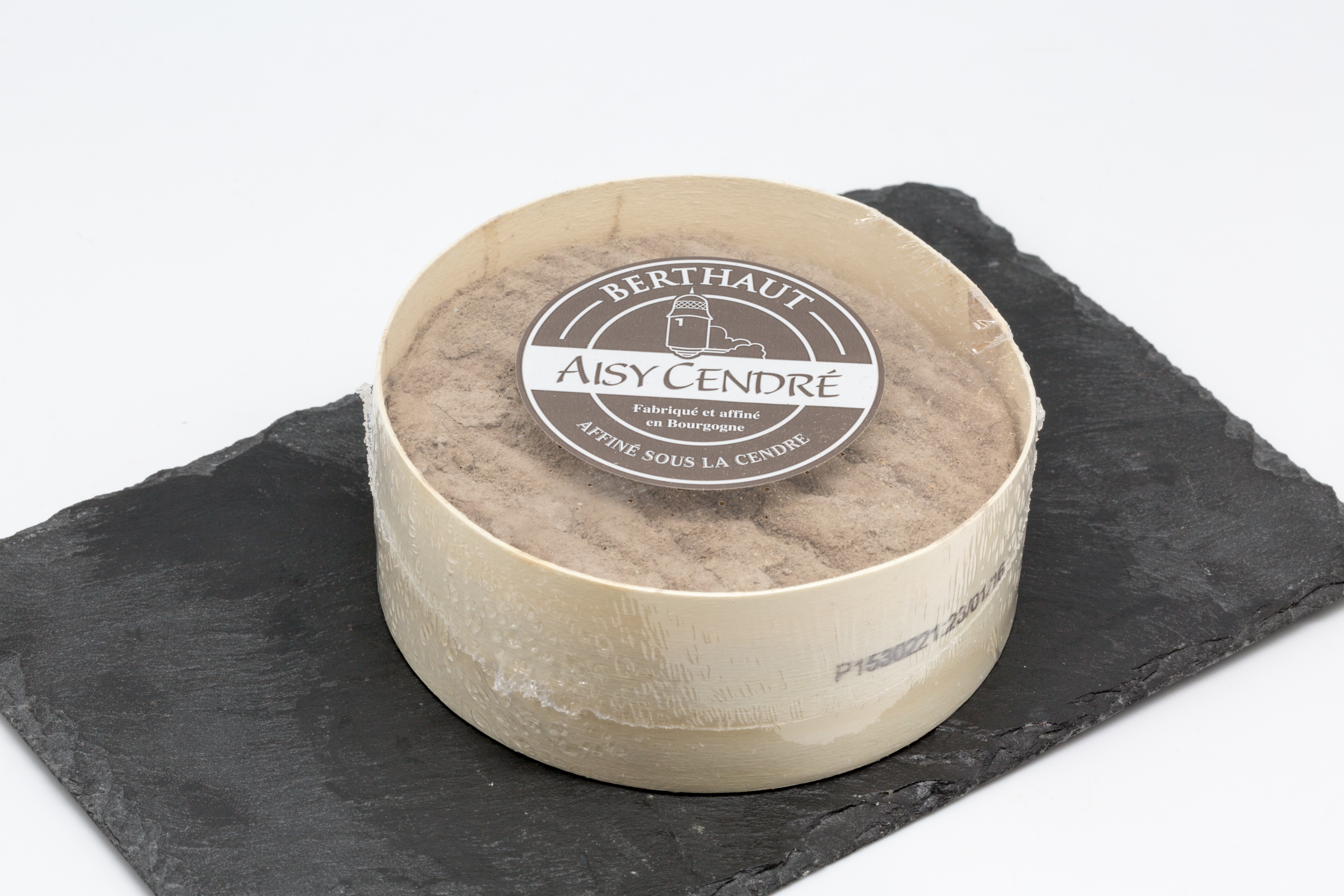
Aisy cendré

Aisy cendré (French: Ashen Aisy; named after Aisy-sous-Thil, a nearby town) is a French cheese made from cow milk, made by a company in Époisses, Bourgogne (Burgundy, a region in France).

It has a washed rind, contains at least 50% fat and has an average weight of 230 grams, with a diameter of 110 mm and a height of 35 mm. Its paste has a slightly smoked aroma and ripens into a soft texture, but is typically eaten while still firm. It is refined for two weeks by scrubbing the rind and is then rolled in wood ash, giving it a greyish color. Production of Aisy cendré was 7 tonnes in 1991. Being made in Époisses, it profits from the reputation of the town's fabrication techniques, even though its preparation is very different from the other cheeses found there.

== See also ==
- Époisses cheese
- List of cheeses
