= John of Réôme =

French Christian abbot

Saint John of Réôme
- Born: 425
- Hometown: near Langres, France
- Died: 539; Réôme Abbey, France
- Venerated in: Roman Catholic Church; Eastern Orthodox Church
- Feast: 28 January

Saint John of Réôme (French: Jean de Réôme, Latin: Iohannis Reomaensis; died c. 539) was an early Christian abbot in what is now Moutiers-Saint-Jean in the Côte-d'Or department of France.

His feast is on 28 January.

== Life ==
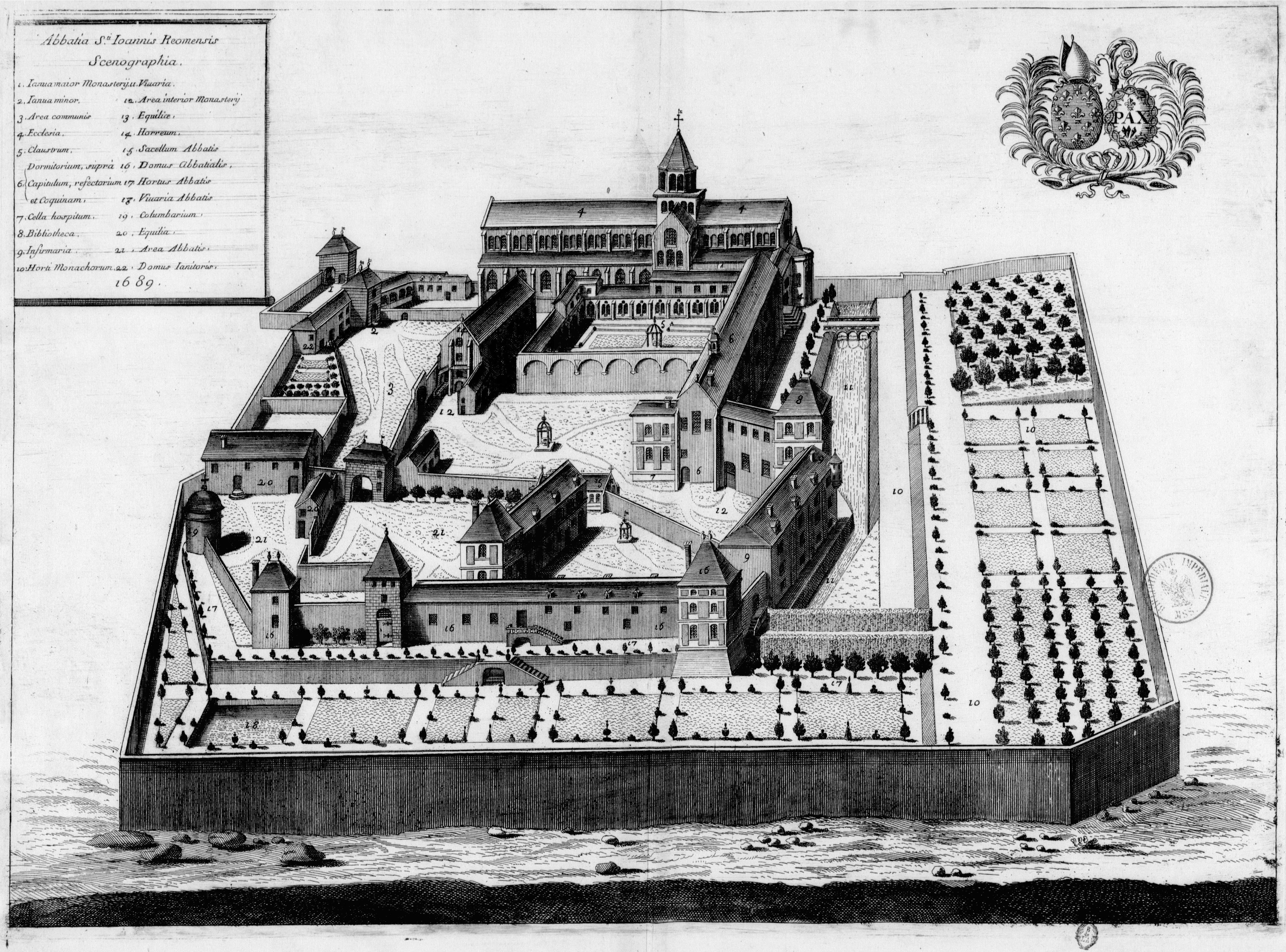
Abbaye Saint-Jean-de-Réome in Monasticon Gallicanum (17th century)

John of Réôme was born in Courtangy, France, around 450. At the age of 20, he became a hermit at Réôme (now Ménétreux), but was joined by disciples. When their numbers grew too great, he escaped to Lérins Abbey, where he became a monk. At Lérins Abbey he lived under the rule of Macarius of Egypt. John was at Lérins Abbey in the period 506–510, when Porcarius I (fl. 489–495) was abbot there. Porcarius was the author of the Monita (Counsels), a short collection of spiritual wisdom. John was discovered and his bishop recalled him to found a monastery at Réôme in the commune of Corsaint. The Réôme Abbey also followed the rule of Macarius, and was one of the first in Burgundy. He had a high reputation for sanctity and was said to have worked various miracles. He died between 539 and 544.

Jonas of Susa wrote John of Réôme's biography. His Vita Iohannis Reomaensis shows the influence of Porcarius's Monita on him in its idealization of the spiritual life. John's remains were preserved during the Saracen invasion in 731, and again when the Vikings invaded in 888. In 1793, the main relics escaped being destroyed during the French Revolution.

== Monks of Ramsgate account ==
The Monks of Ramsgate wrote in their Book of Saints (1921),

JOHN (St.) Abbot. (Jan. 28)
(6th century) Styled by the Roman Martyrology "A man of God." Born near Langres in France, early in life he built a monastery on the banks of the little river Reaume, of which he became the Abbot. His death is placed at about A.D. 539.

== Butler's account ==
The hagiographer Alban Butler (1710–1773) wrote in his Lives of the Fathers, Martyrs, and Other Principal Saints,

St JOHN of Reomay, now called Moutier-Saint-Jean, in Burgundy, Ab. He was a native of the diocese of Langres, and took the monastic habit at Lerins. He was called into his own country by the bishop of Langres to found the abbey from which he received his surname. He settled it under the rule of Saint Macarius, governed it many years with great reputation of sanctity, and was rendered famous by miracles. He went to God about the year 405, being almost 120 years old, and was one of the holy institutors of the monastic state in France. Saint Gregory of Tours gives an account of him in the 87th chapter of his book, On the glory of Confessors. His life was also compiled by Jonas, the disciple of Columban, extant in Bollandus. See P. Rover. Hist. Monast. S. Joan. Reom. Paris. 1637.

== Ranbeck's account ==
Ægidius Ranbeck (1608–1692) wrote in his Heiliges Benedictiner-Jahr (Saints of the Order of Saint Benedict; 1677),

Saint John, Abbot

Saint John is renowned as having lived to the almost unheard of age of a hundred and twenty years. His parents wished to have brought him up to be a soldier, but his ambition was of quite another kind, and the only victory he longed to achieve was that of virtue over vice, so he fled from his home, and built himself a log hut in a remote village, where, with two boys for his companions, he led a hermit’s life. But even in the forest Saint John could not command the solitude he desired, for the fame of his sanctity caused many people to seek his counsel, who aspired to lead a holy life; therefore, in order to escape their assiduity, he fled by night with his companions and visited the monasteries of Gaul, finally taking up his abode at Lerins. There, after some time, he was discovered by one of his former subjects, who appealed to the Bishop of Langres to prevail on him to return to his previous abode. Here he became renowned for his miracles. Once when there was no water for the use of his Community, a well was discovered in answer to his prayers, by which their thirst could have been abundantly supplied, but when the water was tasted it was found to be so noxious that no one could drink it. Again the Saint was applied to, and, in answer to his prayers, the water became wholesome and pure. At his voice devils would come out of those who were tormented by them, while he encouraged all by his piety to lead a life of holy fear, in order that they might come to a happy death. Once when his monks were at manual labour, chopping trees, the bell suddenly summoned them to the church for the Divine Office, and they left their axes cleft in the boughs. On their return to work, they found that the axes had been stolen, and immediately reported the loss to Saint John. He ordered them to apply themselves to study, and forthwith set himself to pray, and with such success that the thief found himself obliged, nolens volens, to restore the axes. Saint John died at the age of one hundred and twenty years, in the year 700, and many miracles were wrought at his tomb.

== Sources ==
- Butler, Alban (1798), The Lives of the Primitive Fathers, Martyrs, and Other Principal Saints, vol. 1, J. Moir This article incorporates text from this source, which is in the public domain.
- Del Cogliano, Mark (2002), "Porcarius of Lérins and His counsels: A Monastic Study, Part I", American Benedictine Review, 53 (4): 400–425
- Del Cogliano, Mark (2003), "Porcarius of Lérins and His counsels: A Monastic Study, Part II", American Benedictine Review, 54 (1): 30–58
- Halton, Thomas Patrick (1967), "John of Réôme, St.", The New Catholic Encyclopedia, Washington
- Le Pree, James Francis (2010), "Pseudo-Basil's De admonitio ad filium spiritualem: A New English Translation", The Heroic Age: A Journal of Early Medieval Northwestern Europe (13)
- Ranbeck, Father Aegedius, O.S.B. (1896), Father J. Alphonsus Morrall, O.S.B. (ed.), Saints of the Order of Saint Benedict, vol. January/February/March, translated by J P Molohan, M.A., Translated from the 1677 Latin edition published in Augsburg Monastery, England This article incorporates text from this source, which is in the public domain.
- St. Augustine's Abbey, Ramsgate (1921). The Book of saints : a dictionary of servants of God canonized by the Catholic Church. London: A. & C. Black, ltd. OCLC 671676136. This article incorporates text from this source, which is in the public domain.
- Watkins, Basil (2015-11-19), The Book of Saints: A Comprehensive Biographical Dictionary, Bloomsbury Publishing, ISBN 978-0-567-66415-0
- Wood, Ian N. (2018), "Columbanus, the Columbanian Tradition and Caesarius", in D. G. Tor (ed.), The ʿAbbasid and Carolingian Empires: Comparative Studies in Civilizational Formation, Brill
