= Athie, Côte-d'Or =

Athie
- Commune
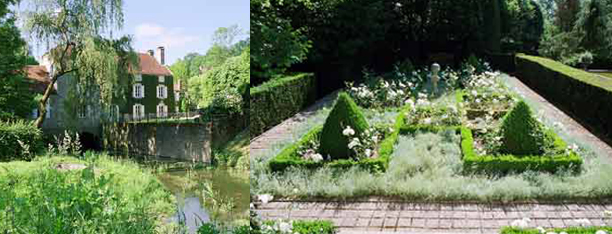
- The Moulin d'Athie
- Location of Athie
- Location within France Location within Bourgogne-Franche-Comté
- Coordinates: 47°34′01″N 4°15′17″E
- Country: France
- Region: Bourgogne-Franche-Comté
- Department: Côte-d'Or
- Arrondissement: Montbard
- Canton: Montbard
- Intercommunality: CC Montbardois

Government
  - Mayor (2020–2026): Pascal Lhuillier
- Area^{1}: 5.92 km^{2} (2.29 sq mi)
- Elevation: 214 m (702 ft)
- Highest elevation: 403 m (1,322 ft)
- Lowest elevation: 210 m (690 ft)
- Population (2023): 82
  - Density: 14/km^{2} (36/sq mi)
- Time zone: UTC+01:00 (CET)
  - Summer (DST): UTC+02:00 (CEST)
- INSEE/Postal code: 21029 /21500
- ^{1} French Land Register data, which excludes lakes, ponds, glaciers > 1 km^{2} (0.386 sq mi or 247 acres) and river estuaries.

Athie (French pronunciation: [ati]) is a commune in the Côte-d'Or department in the Bourgogne-Franche-Comté region of eastern France.

== Geography ==
Athie is located some 12 km south-west of Montbard and 13 km north-east of Époisses. Access to the commune is by road D4 from Senailly in the north which passes through the village and continues south-west to Bard-lès-Époisses. The D1 road comes from Moutiers-Saint-Jean in the west passing through the village and merging with the D4 then continuing south-east to Viserny. There is a large band of forest in the north-east of the commune with small patches south of the village and the rest of the land is farmland.

The Armançon river flows through the centre of the commune from south to north, eventually joining the Yonne at Migennes. The Reome river flows from the west to join the Armançon in the village.

== History ==
During the French Revolutionary National Convention period (1792-1795), the commune, formerly called Athie-lès-Moutier, took the name Athie-sous-Réome.

== Administration ==
List of Successive Mayors

From	To	Name
2001	2008	Michel Lhuillier
2008	2026	Pascal Lhuillier

== Demography ==
Historical population

Year	Pop.	±% p.a.
1793	251	—
1821	252	+0.01%
1846	229	−0.38%
1872	203	−0.46%
1901	146	−1.13%
1926	116	−0.92%
1946	84	−1.60%
1962	90	+0.43%
1968	88	−0.37%

Year	Pop.	±% p.a.
1975	76	−2.07%
1982	74	−0.38%
1990	70	−0.69%
1999	92	+3.08%
2007	90	−0.27%
2012	85	−1.14%
2017	75	−2.47%
2023	82	+1.50%

Source: EHESS and INSEE

== Sites and monuments ==
There is a Cemetery Cross (15th century) next to a country church which is registered as a historical monument.

A garden is located at the Moulin d'Athie. Additionally, a Pietà stands at the crossroads of Rue Haute and Grande Rue.

The parish Church of Saint-Cassien contains several items which are registered as historical objects:

- Statue: Saint-Cassien (18th century)
- Statue: Sainte Barbe (15th century)
- Statue: Virgin and Child (14th century)
- Statue: Saint Jacques (16th century)
- Statue: Christ (14th century)
- Tabernacle (15th century)

== See also ==
- Communes of the Côte-d'Or department
