= Doorway from Moutiers-Saint-Jean =

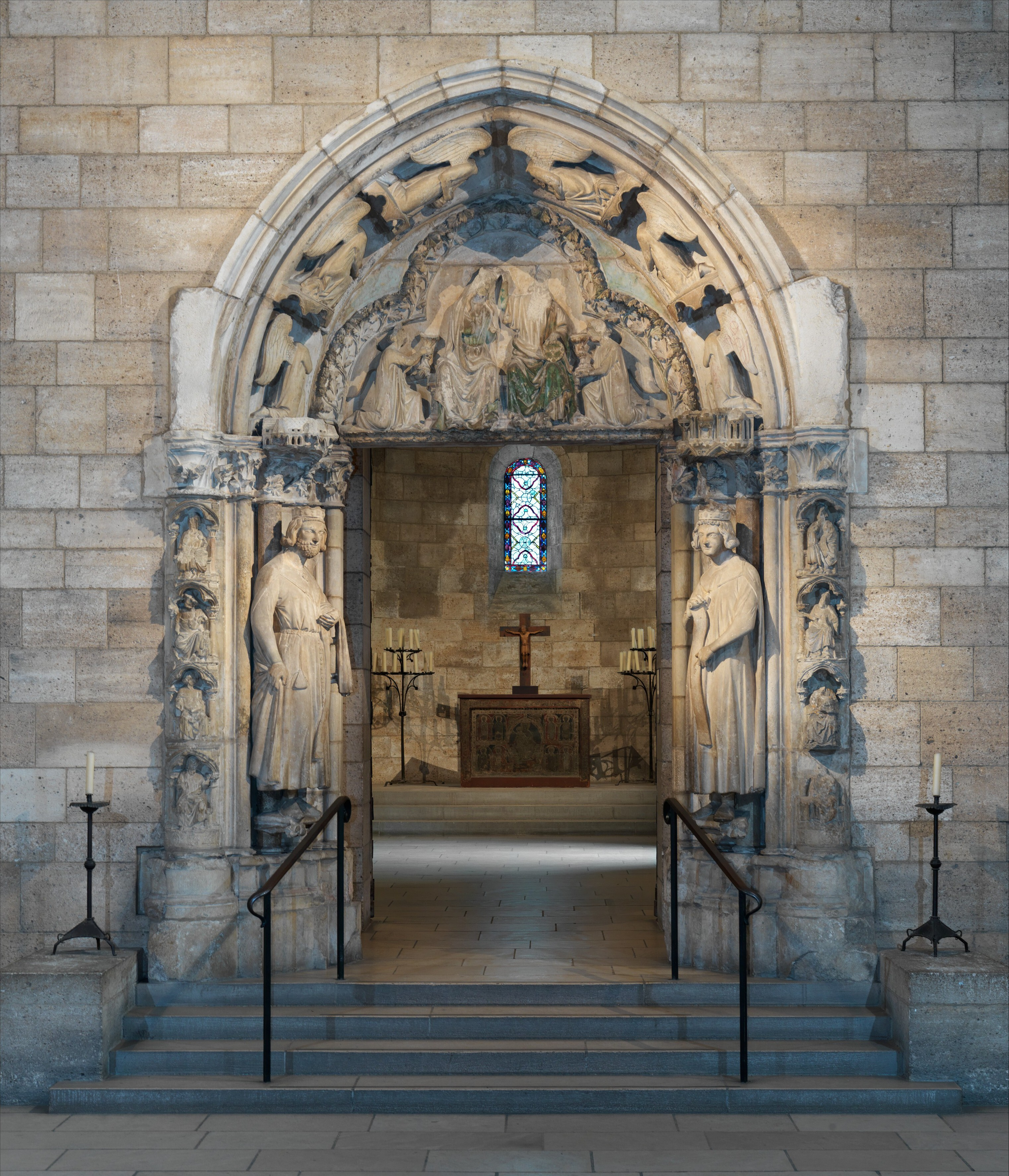
Doorway, French, c. 1250. 470 × 140 cm at its widest points. The apse of the Langon Chapel is in the background

The Doorway from Moutiers-Saint-Jean is a portal dating from c 1250, originally for the monastery of Moutiers-Saint-Jean, near Dijon, Burgundy, France, and installed at The Cloisters, New York City, since 1932. It was designed in the Gothic style and carved from white oolitic limestone. The abbey was founded in the 5th century, and became a major center of influence. The abbey was patronised by a line of kings and nobles over the centuries; at one time it was financed by the dukes of Burgundy.

Moutiers-Saint-Jean was sacked, burned and rebuilt a number of times; in 1567 the Huguenot army struck off the heads of the two kings. In 1797, after the French Revolution, the entire building was sold as rubble for rebuilding. It lay in ruin for decades, with the sculpture severely defaced, before the door's transfer to New York, where it is now situated between the Romanesque Hall and the Langon Chapel. The doorway, the main portal of the abbey, was probably built as the south transept door, facing the cloister. It can be linked stylistically to a number of other similar contemporary works in France. The sculptured forms of the donors, flanking either side of the doorway, probably represent the early Frankish kings Clovis I (d. 511), who converted to Christianity c 496, and his son Chlothar I (d. 561). The piers are lined with elaborate and highly detailed rows of statuettes which are mostly set in niches, and are badly damaged; most have been decapitated.

The doorway has been described as "without doubt the finest Gothic portal in America", while the Cloisters considers it amongst their most prized objects, due mainly to the richness and delicacy of its style and the care shown to its overall composition.

== Style ==
Art historians detect at least two different hands working simultaneously on the structure's architectural elements, in particular the two outer pier capitals (which seem to be earlier in style than the other capitals) on either side are of a different style and type. However, it is thought that both sculptors worked on either embrasure, so that neither right nor left can be fully attributed to either hand. Given the size and form of the outer piers, it is likely that the portal was originally beneath vaulting covering an ambulatory passage. A 1689 engraving also suggests this.

Art historian Bonnie Young observes that although individual styles are mixed, the frame overall forms a "harmonious and magnificent whole", and contains naturalistic carvings wholly different from the more common Romanesque type.

The overall style of the carvings has been described as "pseudo-realism", in that for example the heads of the kings at first seem to be portraits, but on closer examination they are idealised types, while the foliage may seem to be botanically correct and based on direct observation, but in reality they are generalised, rather than based on specific and identifiable species.

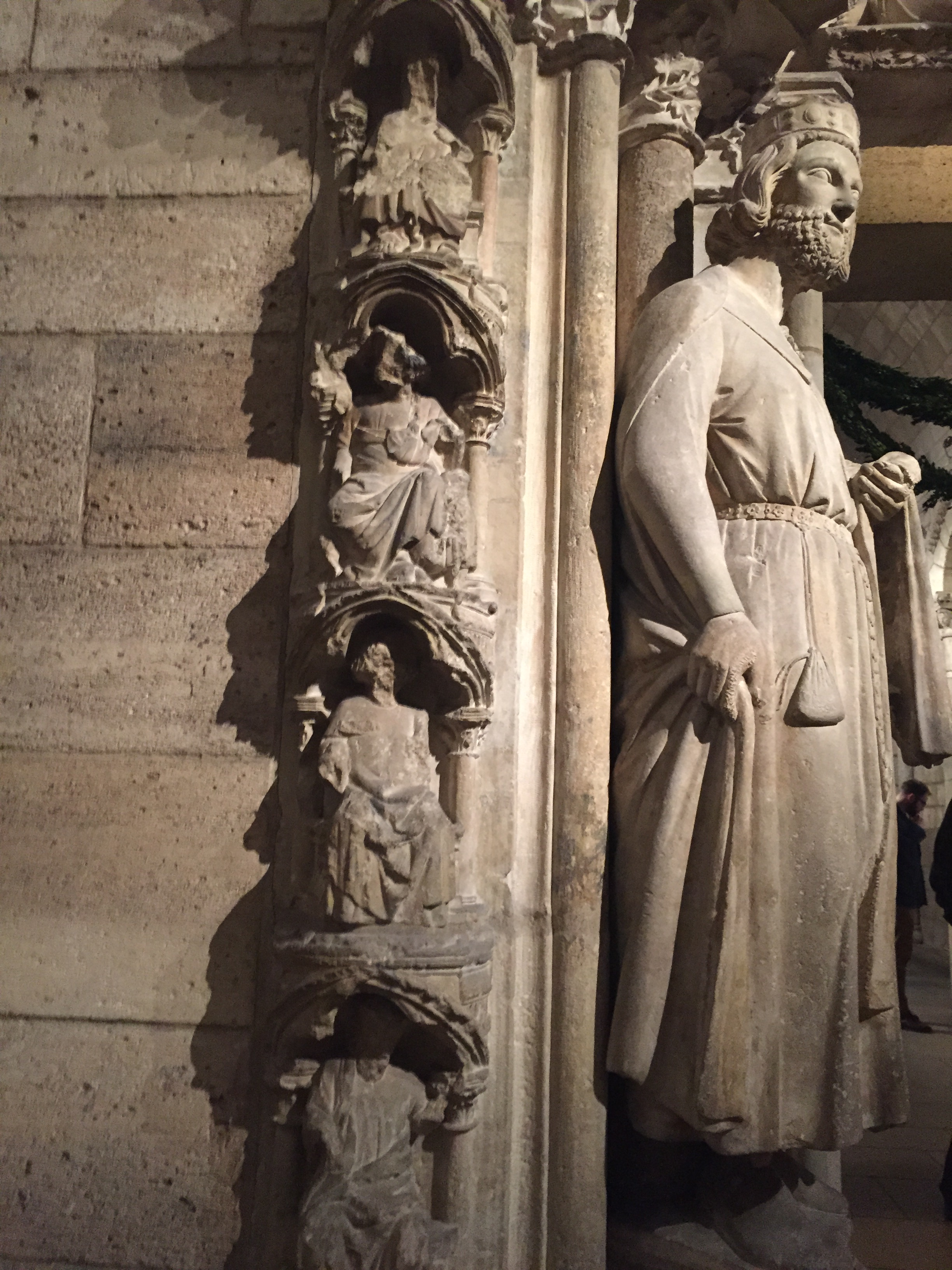

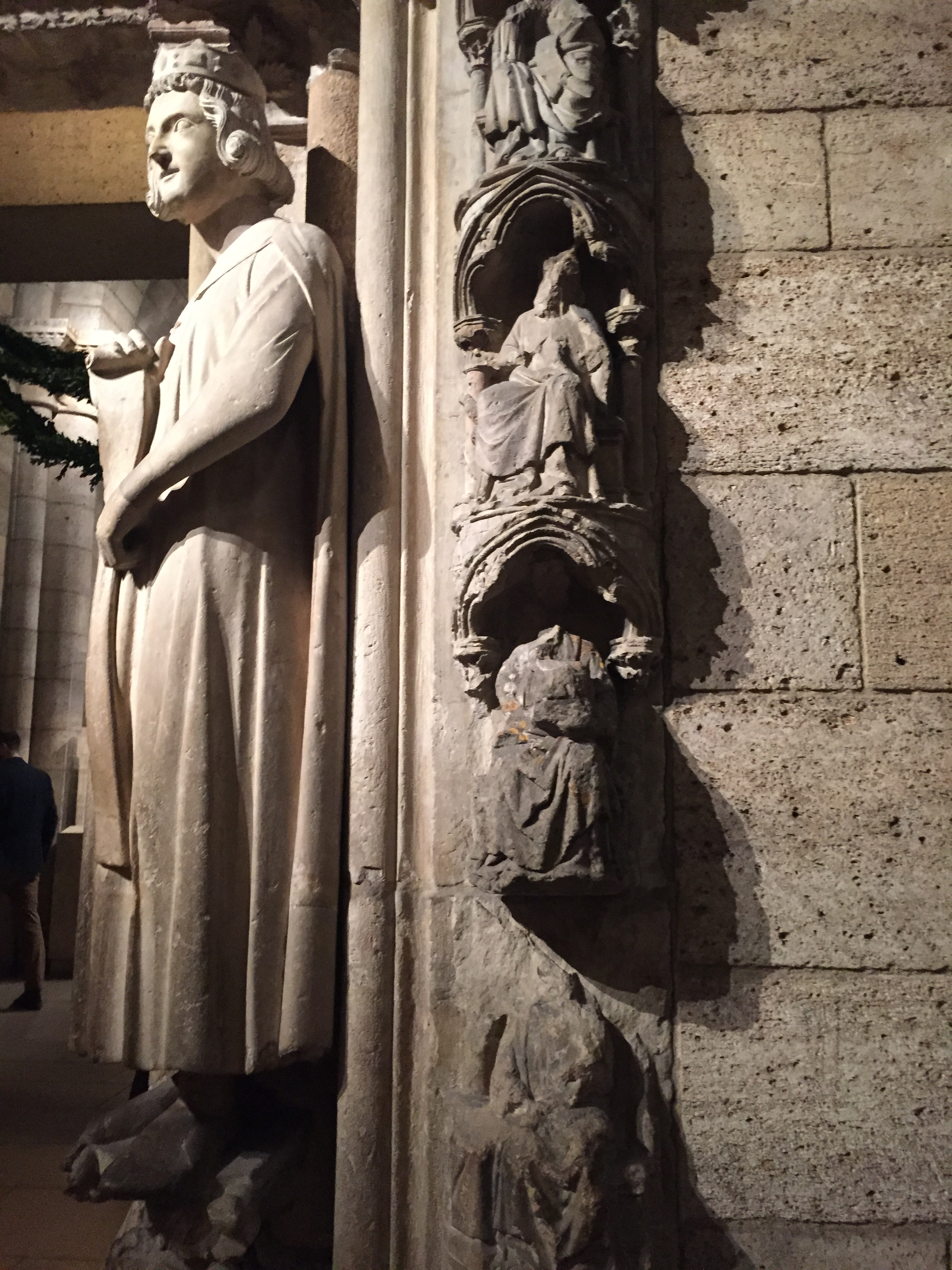

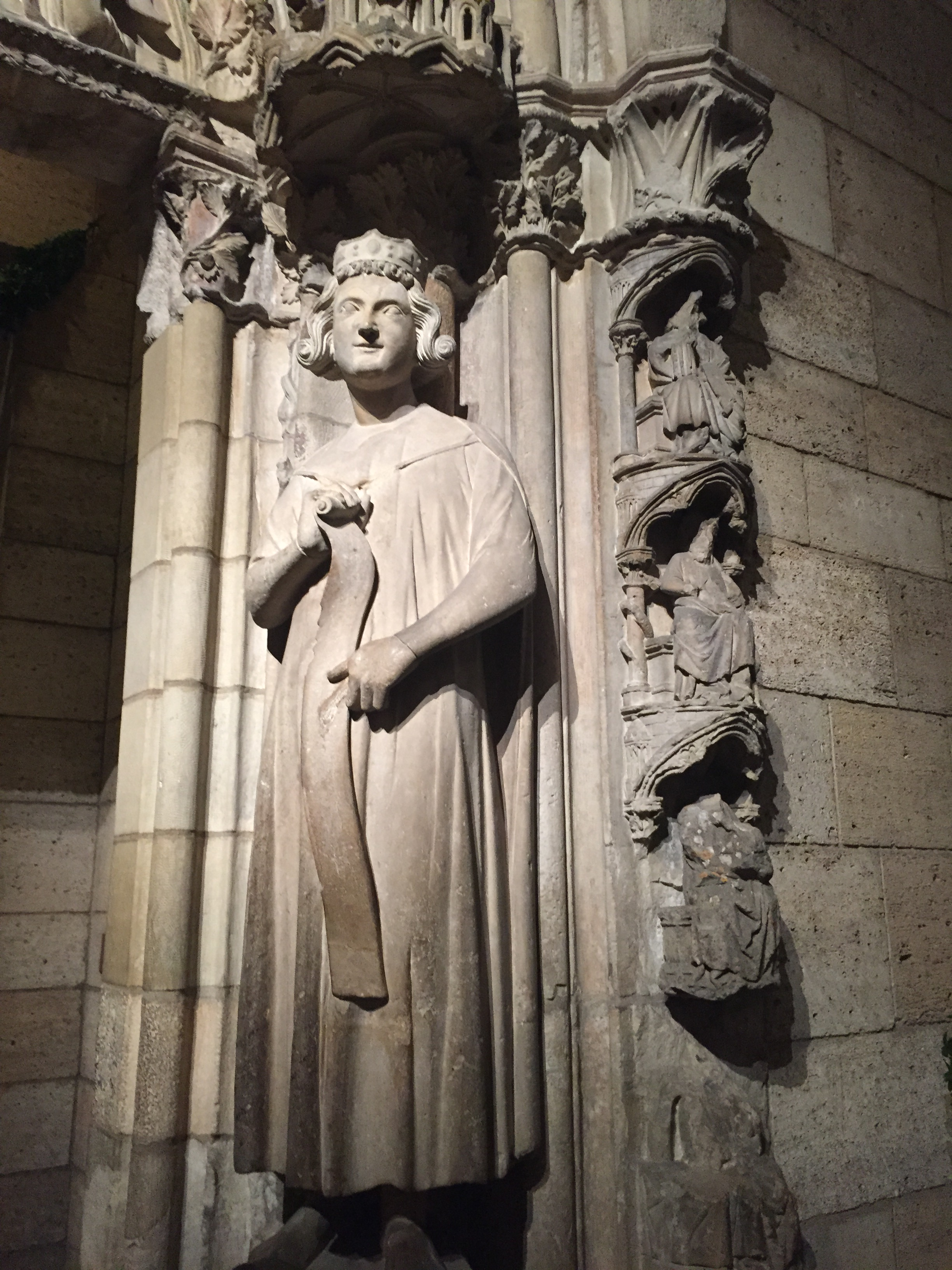

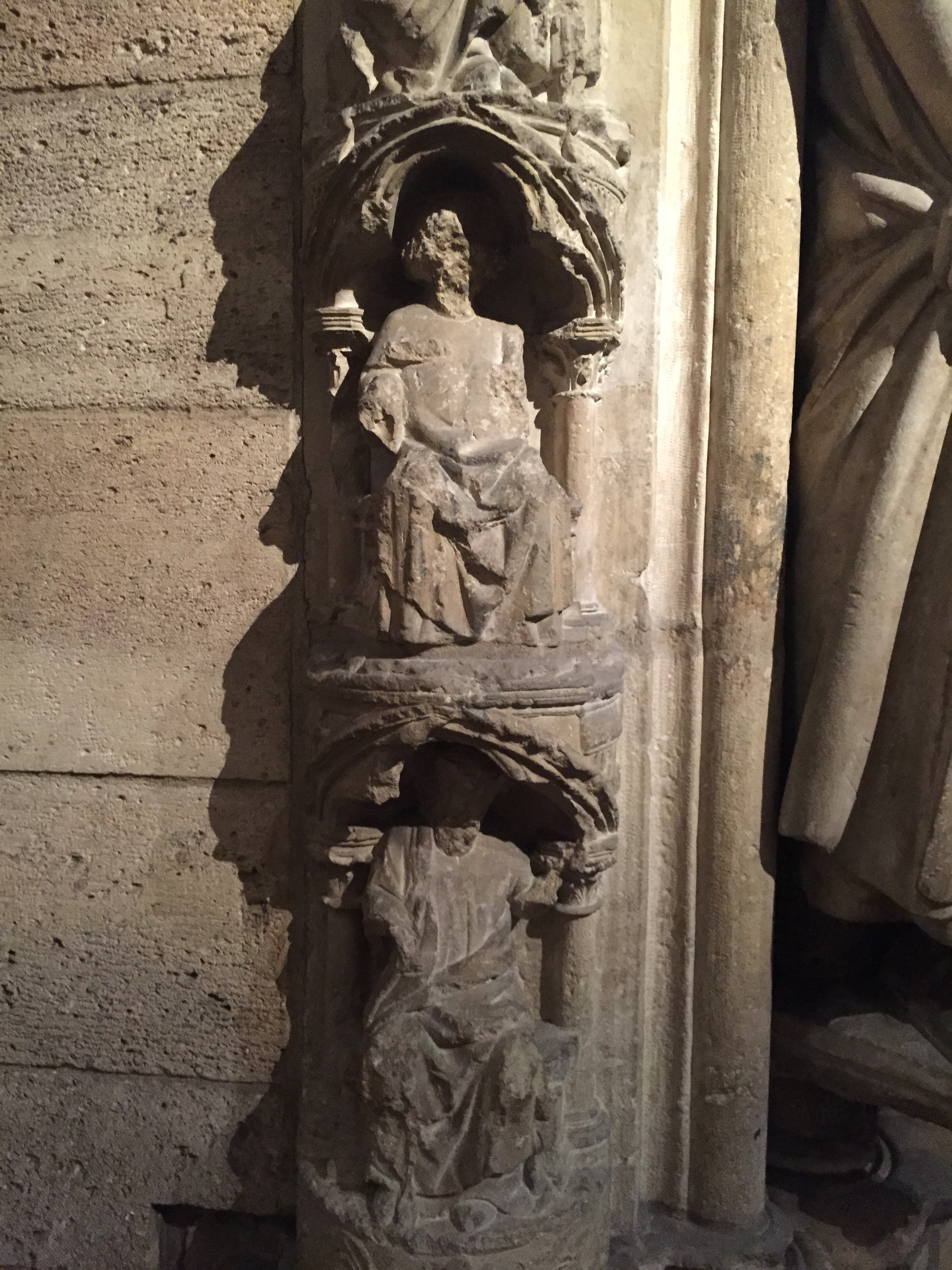

== Architecture ==
The two kings are positioned beneath canopies, and are flanked by colonnettes. They were for a time believed to be David and Solomon, but were identified as Clovis and Chlothar in part from the large scrolls held in their hands, which are more associated with early medieval nobles than biblical figures. The scroll held by Clovis is thought to be the founding document for the abbey, that held by Chlothar the legal confirmation. The capitals are elaborately decorated with carvings of foliage. Carvings of angels hover in the archivolts above the kings.

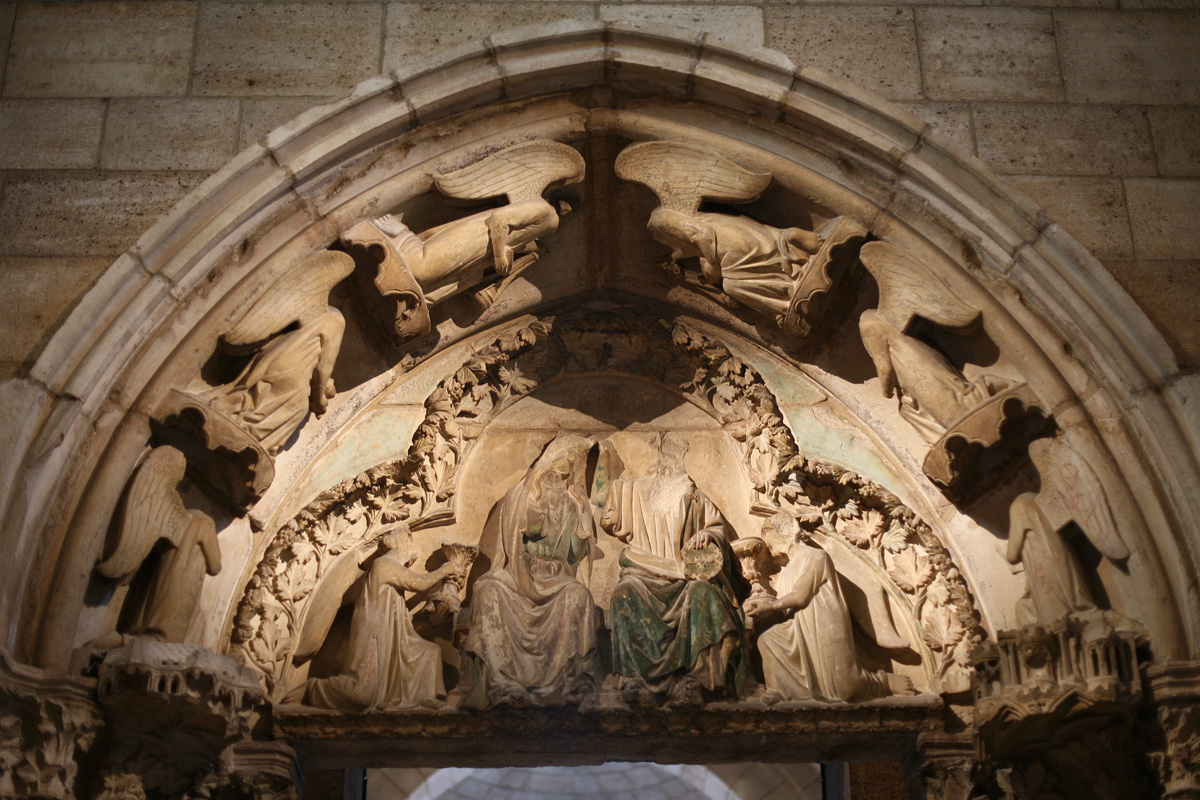
Tympanum with the Coronation of the Virgin

There are three arches linking the doorway to the overhead vault. A trilobed arch over the tympanum, a middle arch with kneeling angels, and an outermost arch resting on the piers. The tympanum contains carvings showing the Coronation of the Virgin, a popular theme for the tympana of 13th century French doorways. The passage has suffered some damage, and some figures have lost their heads or hands. The passage shows the Virgin sitting to Christ's right (the place of honor), bending toward him as he crowns her with his right hand. Her arms are raised in a gesture of veneration. He is holding a jeweled disk, representing his dominion, and is positioned on two lions, indicating that he is occupying the throne of Solomon. Mary's feet rest on a serpent-like creature, probably an adder.

Most of the statuettes have been decapitated, but the figures are thought to include representations of John the Baptist, Simeon and the Christ child, Moses with the serpent, Abraham and Isaac, either David or Jeremiah, and Elijah alongside a raven. They can mostly be grouped into pairs, though are not arranged chronologically.

Other elements from the Moutiers-Saint-Jean abbey, including Romanesque capitals, are kept at the Louvre, at the Fogg Museum, Harvard University, and in a private collection in Bard-les-Epoisses. A foliate capital from the abbey, with a head very similar to those of the two kings, is in Duke University, Durham, North Carolina.

== Acquisition and installation ==
In place and in ruin at Moutiers-Saint-Jean before removal to New York

The abbey was sacked in 1567, in 1595, and in 1629. The doorway suffered damage during the Wars of Religion and during the French Revolution the abbey was almost completely destroyed. Most of the archival documents related to the abbey were lost, but we know from some accounts and engravings how it might have looked. For a period in the 19th century it was walled up.

Its acquisition and installation was led by curator James Rorimer. It was sold by a Mr. Cambillard, a farmer on whose land the abbey was situated, to Jean Peslier, a dealer working out of Vezelay, who passed it to Joseph Brummer, from whom the Metropolitan made their purchase.

Around 1790 or 1791 the kings' heads were removed, but located by Rorimer, and acquired from the Duveen Gallery at the British Museum, and reattached in 1940, while a number of additions added during earlier restorations were removed.

== Sources ==
- Rorimer, James; Rorimer, Katherine. "Medieval monuments at the Cloisters as they were and as they are". New York: Metropolitan Museum of Art, 1972. ISBN 978-0-8709-9027-4
- Barnet, Peter. The Cloisters: Medieval Art and Architecture. CT: Yale University Press, 2005. ISBN 978-1-5883-9176-6
- Forsyth, William. "A Gothic Doorway from Moutiers-Saint-Jean". New York: Metropolitan Museum Journal 13, 1978
- Little, Charles. "Set in Stone : The Face in Medieval Sculpture". New York: Metropolitan Museum of Art, 2006. ISBN 978-1-5883-9192-6
- Parker, Elizabeth. The Cloisters: Studies in Honor of the Fiftieth Anniversary. New York: Metropolitan Museum of Art, 1992. ISBN 978-0-8709-9635-1
- Porter, Arthur. "Romanesque Capitals". Fogg Art Museum 1, no. 2, June 1922
- Young, Bonnie. A Walk Through The Cloisters. New York: Viking Press, 1979. ISBN 978-0-8709-9203-2
