= Moutiers-Saint-Jean Abbey =

Abbey in Côte-d'Or, France

Coordinates: 47.5601°N 4.2226°E

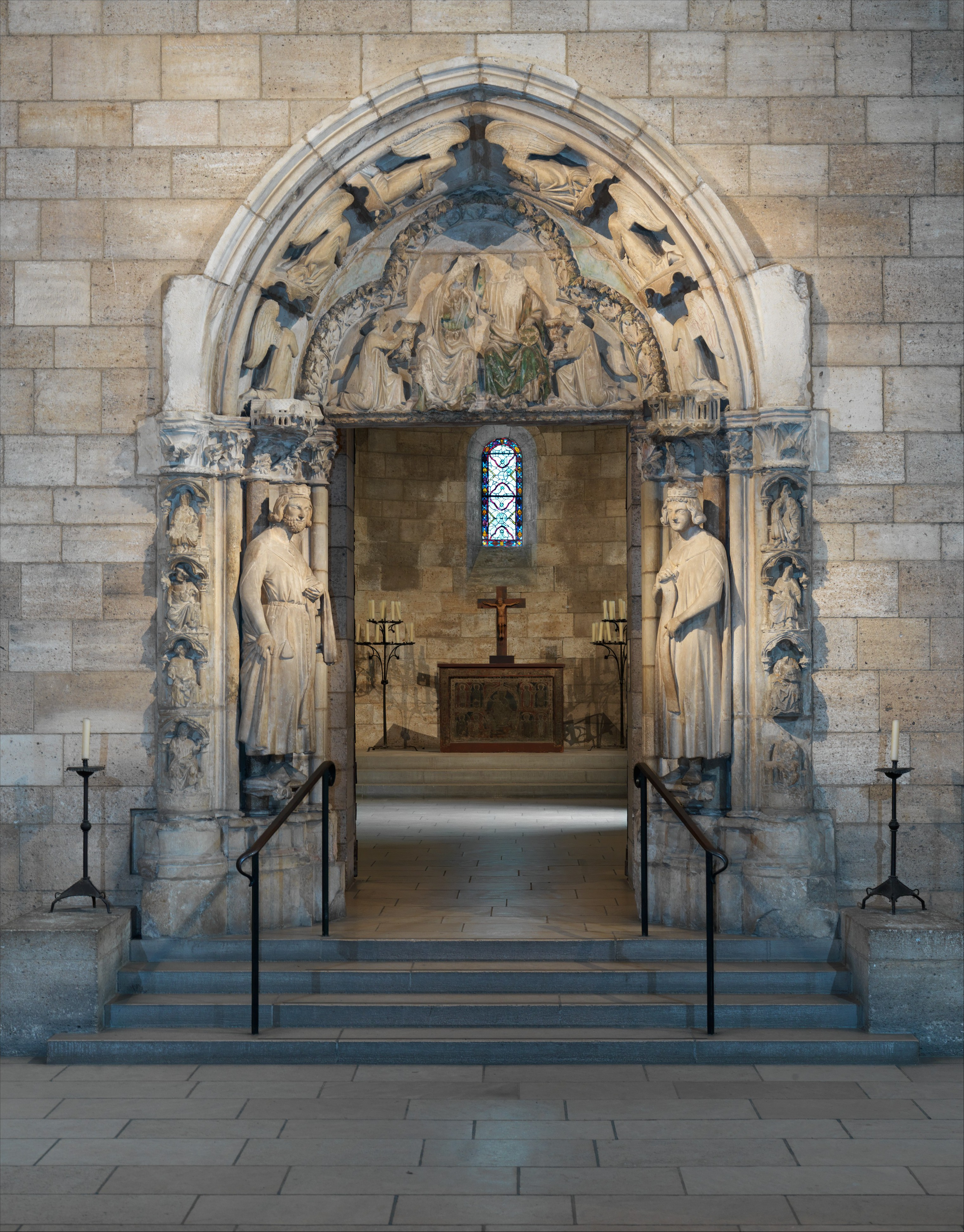
Doorway from Moutiers-Saint-Jean, now in The Cloisters in New York

Moutiers-Saint-Jean Abbey (from Latin monasterium sancti Johannis, French: Abbaye de Moutiers-Saint-Jean, also Abbaye Saint-Jean-de-Réome) was a monastery located in what is now the village of Moutiers-Saint-Jean (named after the monastery) in the Côte-d'Or department in eastern France. It is in Burgundy, northwest of Dijon.

The monastery was founded by a monk named John de Réôme around 450. In the seventh century, during the abbacy of Chunna (Hunnanus), a monk from Remiremont, the original monastic rule, which had been that of the ancient saint Macarius of Alexandria, was replaced by that of Luxeuil, founded by the Irish missionary Columbanus. When Jonas of Bobbio stayed at the monastery in 659, during Chunna's abbacy, he was compelled by the monks to write a biography of their founder. The result was the Vita Iohannis.

In 816–17, Saint-Jean was reformed according to the synods of Aachen. According to the record of monasteries made around that time, it owed the Carolingian state annually both a monetary gift (dona) and a military contribution (militia).

The abbey became a major center of influence, by kings and nobles over the centuries; at one time it was financed by the dukes of Burgundy. Moutiers-Saint-Jean was sacked, burned and rebuilt a number of times; in 1567 the Huguenot army struck off the heads of the two kings on the main doorway. In 1797, after the French Revolution, the entire building was sold as rubble for rebuilding. It lay in ruin for decades, with the sculpture severely defaced, before the Doorway from Moutiers-Saint-Jean was bought from the landowner and moved to New York in 1932, where it is now in The Cloisters museum. Some Romanesque capitals, probably from the nave of the church, are in the Fogg Art Museum, the Louvre, and in the collection at Bard-les-Epoisses. Two spandrels from an arcade are held by the Davis Museum at Wellesley College.

The remains of the abbey (the 14th-century main gate, the facades of two 17th-century buildings, the grounds of the abbey and the abbey church) are protected by the French government.

== See also ==
- Doorway from Moutiers-Saint-Jean

== Sources ==
- Barnet, Peter. The Cloisters: Medieval Art and Architecture. New Haven: Yale University Press, 2005. ISBN 978-1-5883-9176-6
- Diem, Albrecht (2008). "The Rule of an Iro-Egyptian Monk in Gaul: Jonas of Bobbio's Vita Iohannis and the Construction of Monastic Identity". Revue Mabillon. 80: 5–50. doi:10.1484/J.RM.5.101158.
- Fox, Yaniv (2014). Power and Religion in Merovingian Gaul: Columbanian Monasticism and the Frankish Elites. Cambridge University Press.
- Forsyth, William H. (1979). "A Gothic Doorway from Moutiers-Saint-Jean". Metropolitan Museum of Art Journal. 13: 33–74. doi:10.2307/1512709.
- Lesne, Émile (1920). "Les ordonnances monastiques de Louis le Pieux et la Notitia de servitio monasteriorum". Revue d'histoire de l'église de France. 6 (31): 161–75, 321–38 and 449–93. doi:10.3406/rhef.1920.2144.
- Little, Charles. "Set in Stone: The Face in Medieval Sculpture". New York: Metropolitan Museum of Art, 2006. ISBN 978-1-5883-9192-6
- Young, Bonnie. A Walk Through The Cloisters. New York: Viking Press, 1979. ISBN 978-0-8709-9203-2
