= Étienne Bouhot =

French painter and art teacher (1780–1862)

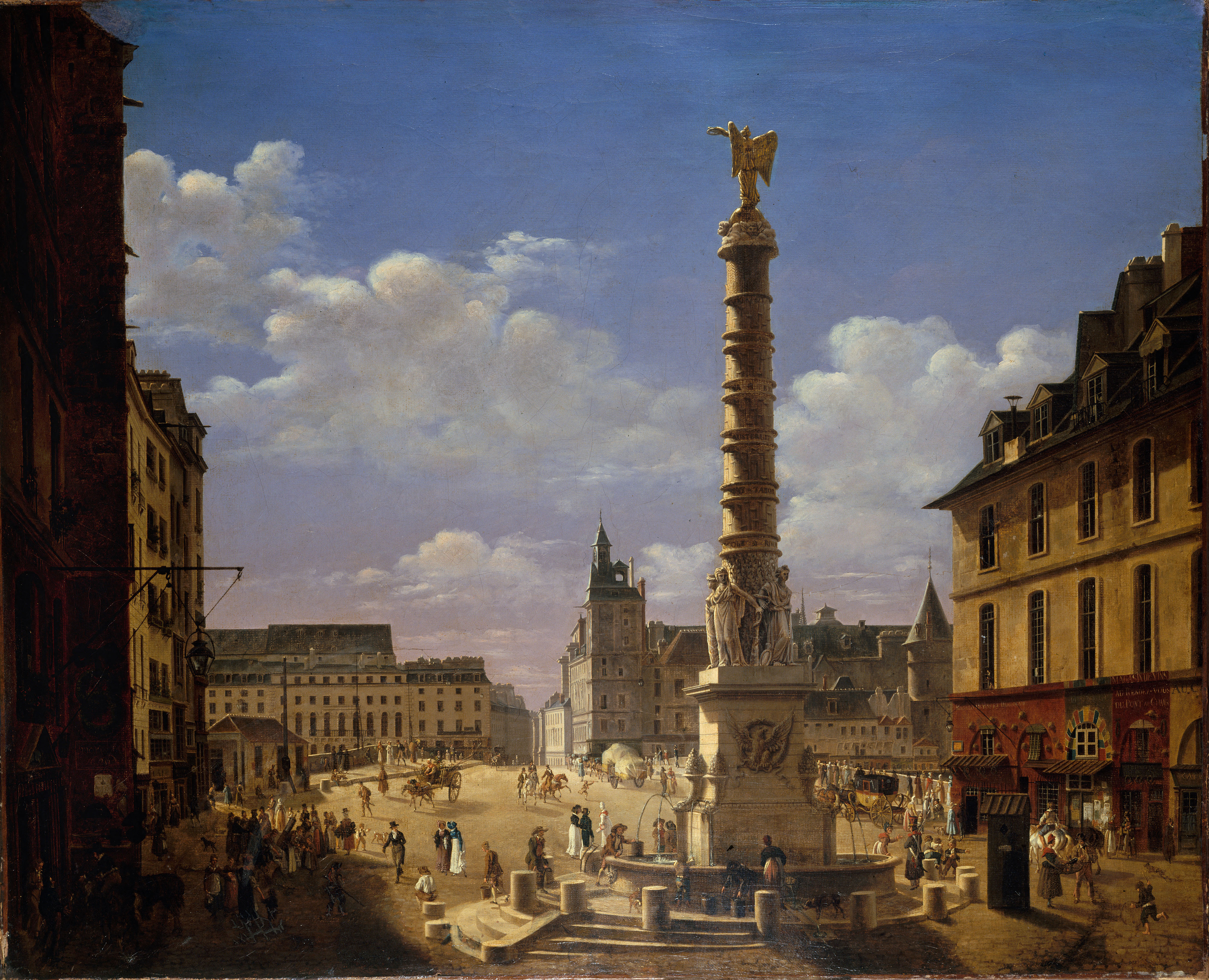
- La Place du Châtelet by Étienne Bouhot (1810), in the Carnavalet Museum
- Born: 8 August 1780; Bard-lès-Époisses
- Died: 17 July 1862 (aged 81); Semur-en-Auxois
- Known for: Painting views of Paris in the 19th century
- Style: Romanticism

Étienne Bouhot (French: [etjɛn buo]; 8 August 1780 – 17 July 1862) was a French painter and art teacher.

Bouhot was born in Bard-lès-Époisses. He was the director of the École de Dessin (School of Drawing) in Semur-en-Auxois, where he lived until his death.

== Gallery ==
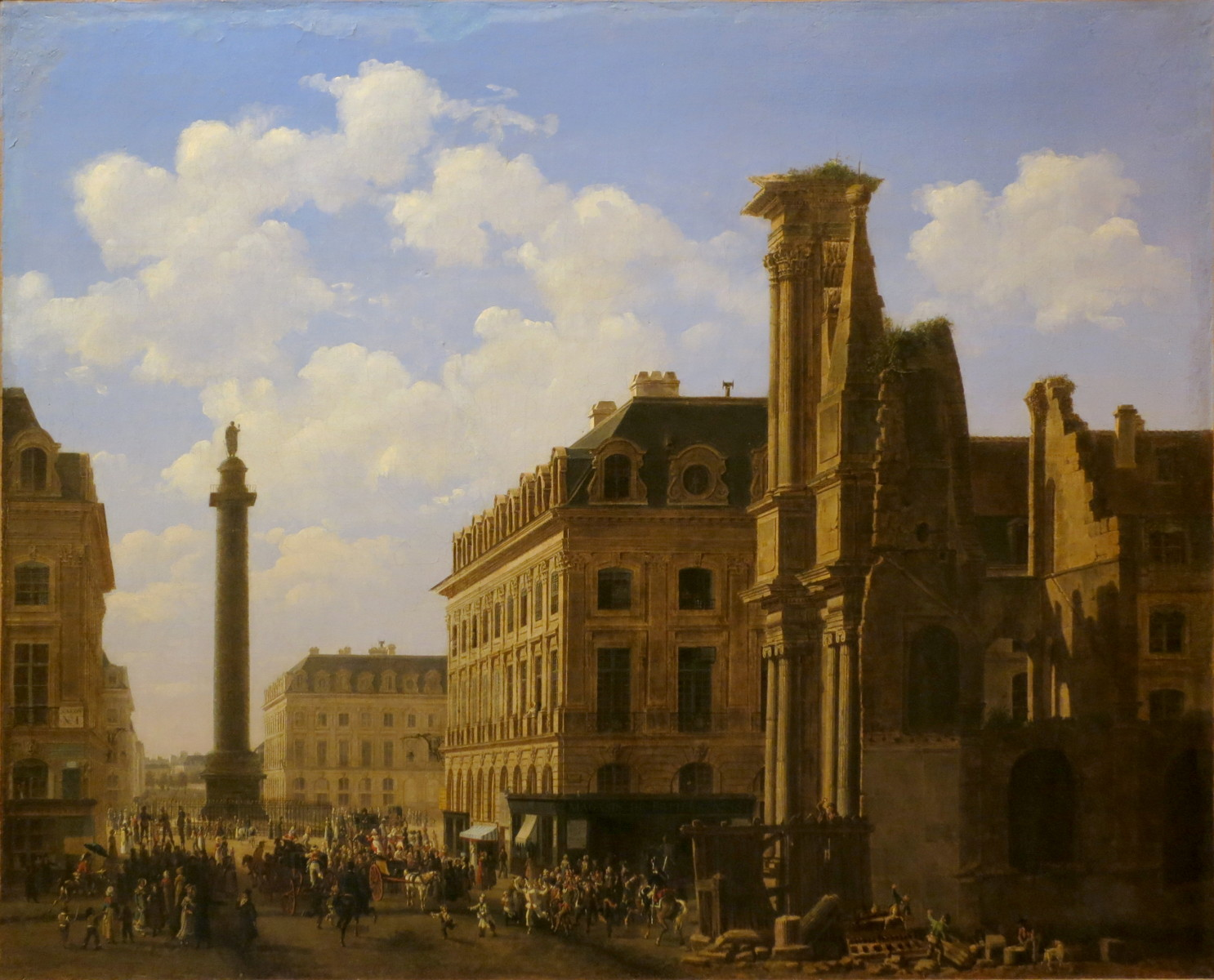
La Place Vendôme et la rue de Castiglione avec les ruines de l'église des Feuillants (1808)

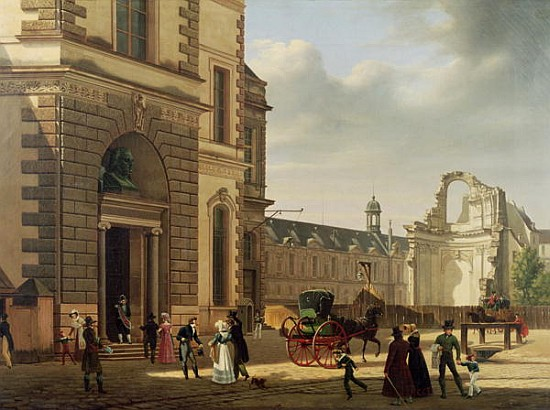
L'Entrée Du Musée Du Louvre Et Les Ruines De L'Abside De Saint-Louis-Du-Louvre (1822)

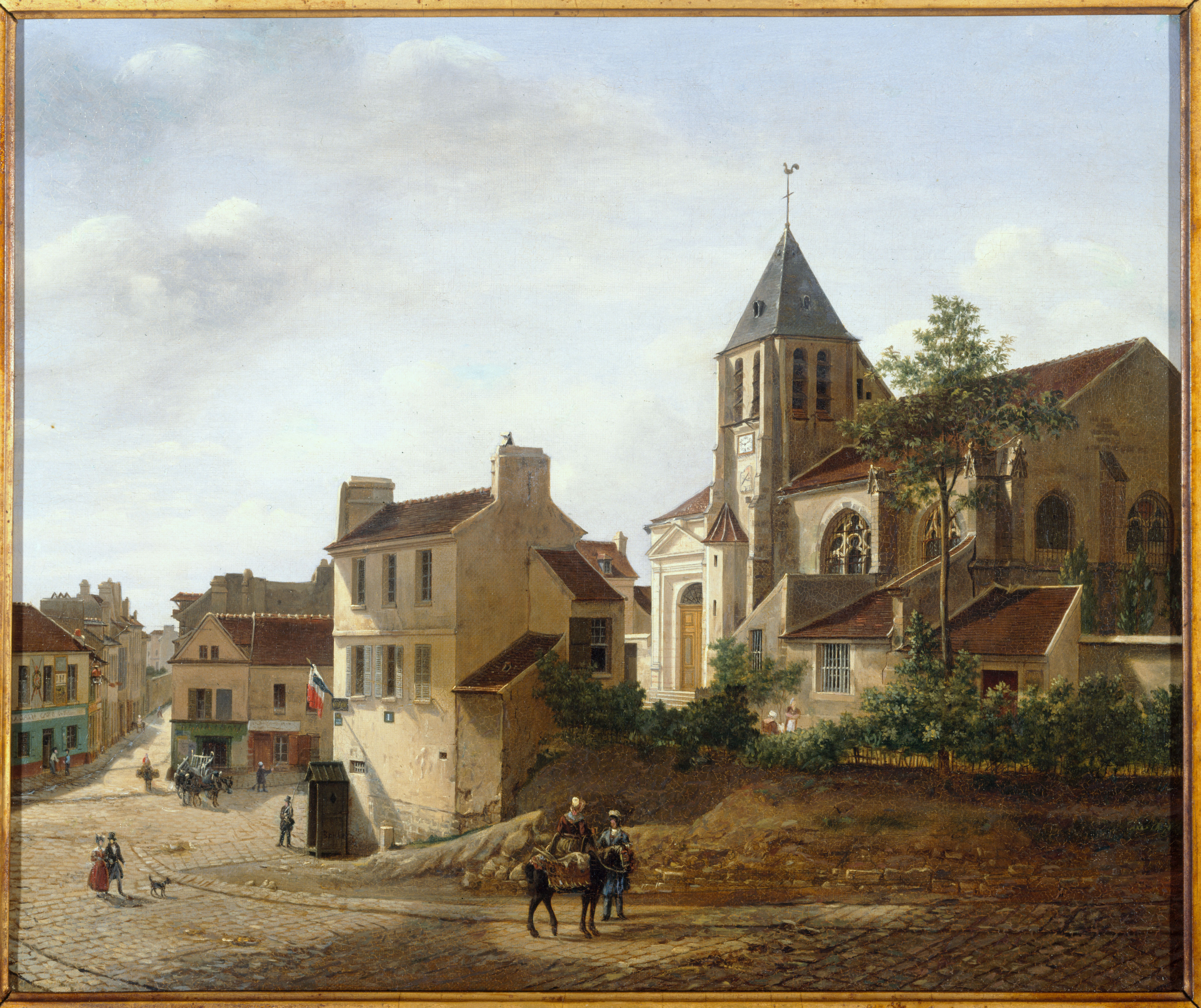
Saint-Germain de Charonne (1830)
