= Aisy-sous-Thil =

- Commune
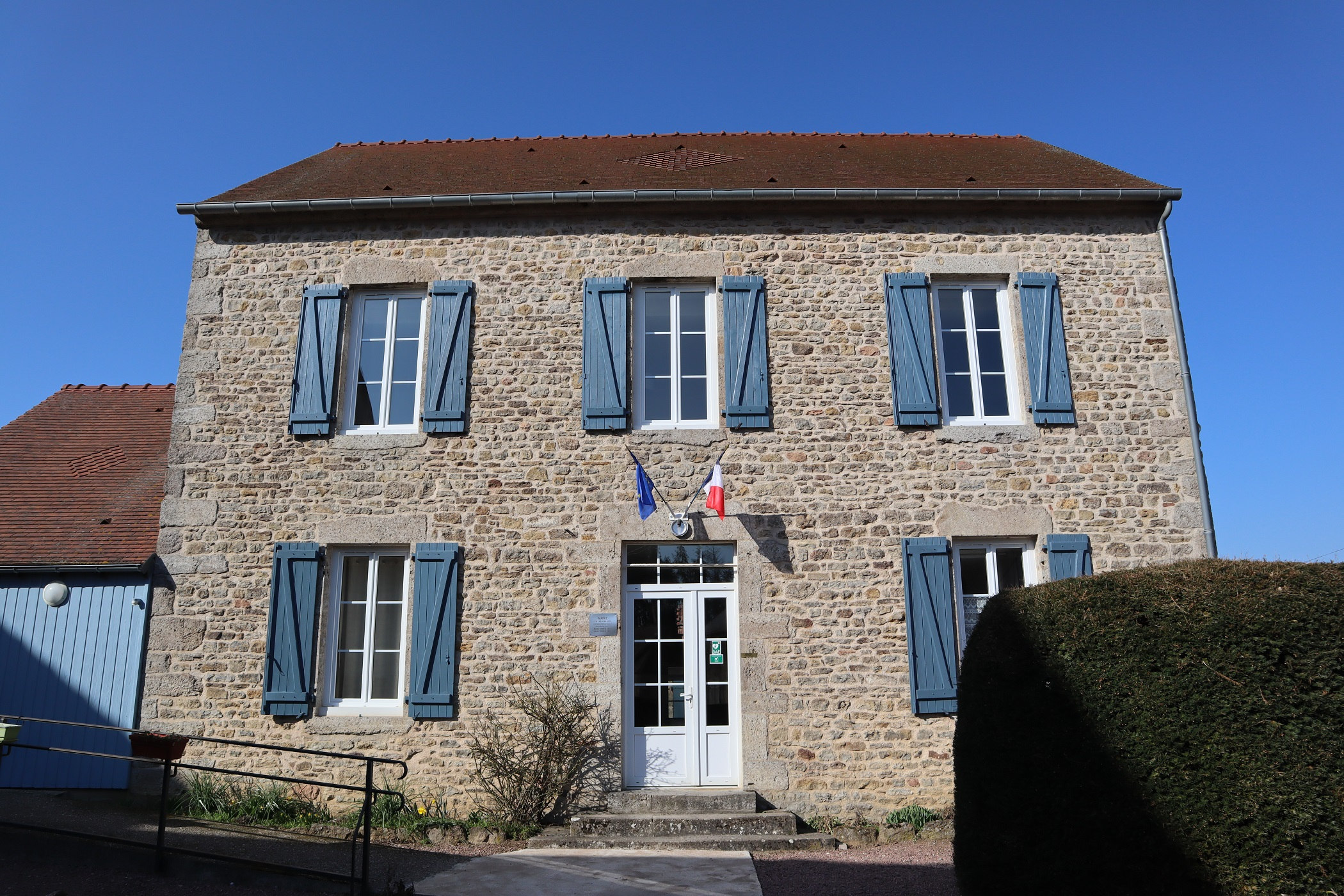
- Town hall
- Location of Aisy-sous-Thil
- Location within France Location within Bourgogne-Franche-Comté
- Coordinates: 47°23′39″N 4°17′18″E
- Country: France
- Region: Bourgogne-Franche-Comté
- Department: Côte-d'Or
- Arrondissement: Montbard
- Canton: Semur-en-Auxois
- Intercommunality: Terres d'Auxois

Government
  - Mayor (2020–2026): Véronique Illig
- Area^{1}: 8.3 km^{2} (3.2 sq mi)
- Elevation: 357 m (1,171 ft)
- Highest elevation: 387 m (1,270 ft)
- Lowest elevation: 313 m (1,027 ft)
- Population (2023): 200
  - Density: 24/km^{2} (62/sq mi)
- Time zone: UTC+01:00 (CET)
  - Summer (DST): UTC+02:00 (CEST)
- INSEE/Postal code: 21007 /21390
- ^{1} French Land Register data, which excludes lakes, ponds, glaciers > 1 km^{2} (0.386 sq mi or 247 acres) and river estuaries.

Aisy-sous-Thil (French pronunciation: [ɛzi su til], literally Aisy under Thil) is a commune in the Côte-d'Or department in the Bourgogne-Franche-Comté region of eastern France.

== Geography ==
Aisy-sous-Thil is about 35 km south-east of Avalon and about 25 km south of Montbard. The Route d'Avalon, (Highway D70) passes directly through the heart of the commune from Avalon in the west to Vitteaux in the east although it does not pass through the village. The village is north of the D70 and can be reached by the Highway D15J off the D70. The Highway D15J passes out of the commune to the south-west and links to Lacour-d'Arcenay. Highway D980 also links with the D70 in the south-east corner of the commune. Highway D36 proceeds north out of the commune. The Autoroute du Soleil (A6/E15) passes about 2 km to the east of the commune. Most of the commune is farmland with some forests in the south-west and north-west. The village of Pont d'aisy is the only other village in the commune—to the south-east of Aisy-sour-Thil village.

The Serein stream forms the eastern border of the commune and the Portrait Stream forms the southern border. There are several ponds in the commune the largest of which is the Etang de Sarmeaux near the D15J south-west of the town.

== Administration ==
List of Successive Mayors of Aisy-sous-Thil

From	To	Name	Party
2001	2014	Lionel Julienne	PS
2014	2026	Véronique Illig	

== Population ==
Historical population
Year	Pop.	±% p.a.
1968	277	—
1975	336	+2.80%
1982	236	−4.92%
1990	229	−0.38%
1999	220	−0.44%
2007	212	−0.46%
2012	231	+1.73%
2017	224	−0.61%
2023	200	−1.87%
Source: INSEE

== Personalities ==
- Edith Royer, founder of the Brotherhood "Prayer and Penance" of Montmartre, was born in the commune.

== See also ==
- Aisy cendré
- Communes of the Côte-d'Or department
- Morvan Regional Natural Park
