= Jeux-lès-Bard =

- Commune
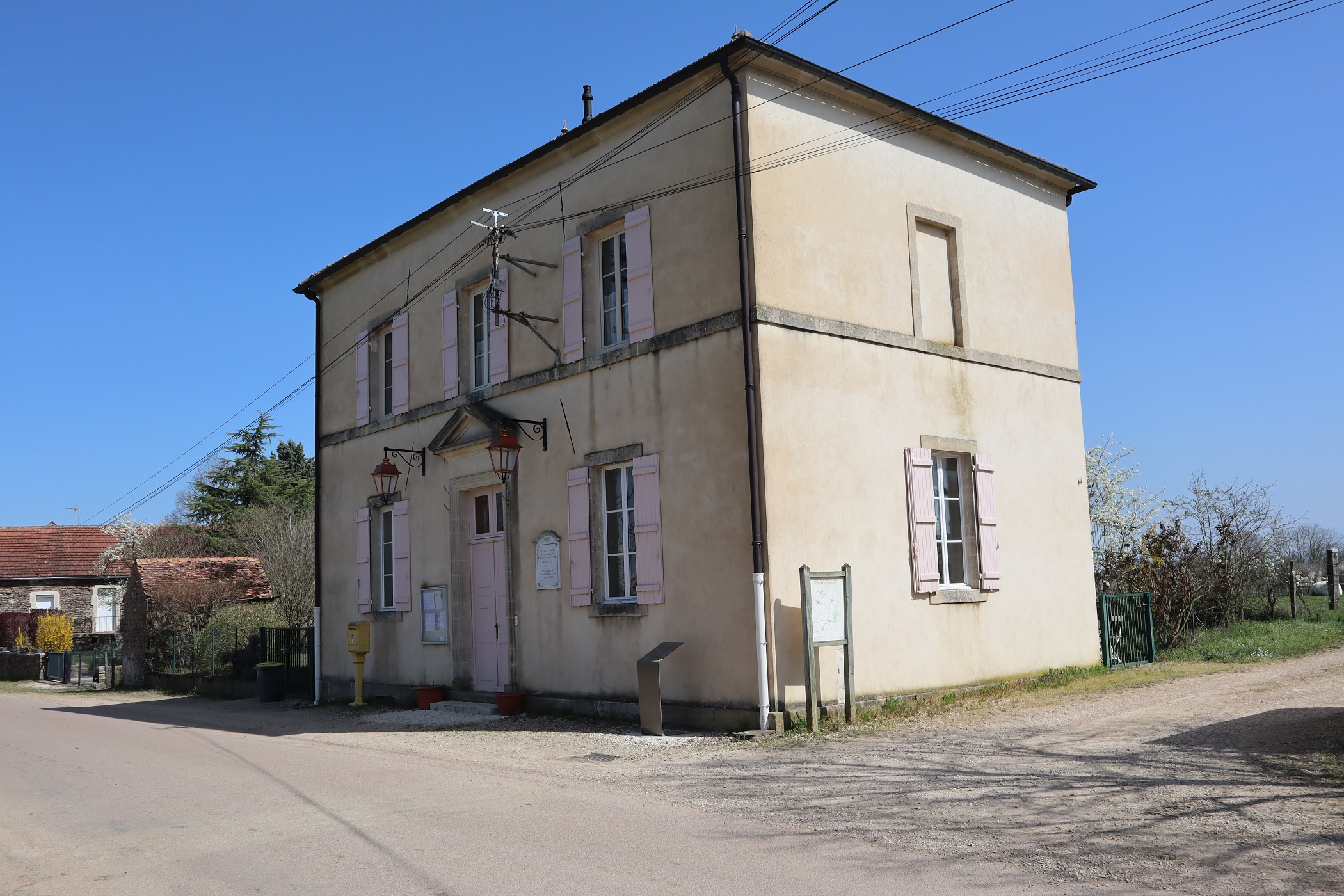
- Jeux-lès-Bard Town hall
- Location of Jeux-lès-Bard
- Location within France Location within Bourgogne-Franche-Comté
- Coordinates: 47°31′57″N 4°15′06″E
- Country: France
- Region: Bourgogne-Franche-Comté
- Department: Côte-d'Or
- Arrondissement: Montbard
- Canton: Semur-en-Auxois

Government
  - Mayor (2020–2026): Sylvain Caverot
- Area^{1}: 3.25 km^{2} (1.25 sq mi)
- Elevation: 230 m (750 ft)
- Highest elevation: 259 m (850 ft)
- Lowest elevation: 219 m (719 ft)
- Population (2023): 52
  - Density: 16/km^{2} (41/sq mi)
- Time zone: UTC+01:00 (CET)
  - Summer (DST): UTC+02:00 (CEST)
- INSEE/Postal code: 21324 /21460
- ^{1} French Land Register data, which excludes lakes, ponds, glaciers > 1 km^{2} (0.386 sq mi or 247 acres) and river estuaries.

Jeux-lès-Bard (French pronunciation: [ʒø lɛ baʁ], literally Jeux near Bard) is a commune in the Côte-d'Or department in eastern France.

== Population ==
Historical population
Year	Pop.	±% p.a.
1968	57	—
1975	45	−3.32%
1982	35	−3.53%
1990	42	+2.31%
1999	39	−0.82%
2007	48	+2.63%
2012	52	+1.61%
2017	52	+0.00%
2023	52	+0.00%
Source: INSEE

== See also ==
- Communes of the Côte-d'Or department
