= Vieux-Château =

- Commune
- Location of Vieux-Château
- Location within France Location within Bourgogne-Franche-Comté
- Coordinates: 47°28′15″N 4°08′05″E
- Country: France
- Region: Bourgogne-Franche-Comté
- Department: Côte-d'Or
- Arrondissement: Montbard
- Canton: Semur-en-Auxois

Government
  - Mayor (2020–2026): Bernard Flanet
- Area^{1}: 6.47 km^{2} (2.50 sq mi)
- Elevation: 282 m (925 ft)
- Highest elevation: 351 m (1,152 ft)
- Lowest elevation: 230 m (750 ft)
- Population (2023): 107
  - Density: 16.5/km^{2} (42.8/sq mi)
- Time zone: UTC+01:00 (CET)
  - Summer (DST): UTC+02:00 (CEST)
- INSEE/Postal code: 21681 /21460
- ^{1} French Land Register data, which excludes lakes, ponds, glaciers > 1 km^{2} (0.386 sq mi or 247 acres) and river estuaries.

Vieux-Château (French pronunciation: [vjø ʃɑto]) is a commune in the Côte-d'Or department in eastern France.

== Population ==
Historical population
Year	Pop.	±% p.a.
1968	159	—
1975	95	−7.09%
1982	98	+0.45%
1990	93	−0.65%
1999	103	+1.14%
2007	99	−0.49%
2012	91	−1.67%
2017	85	−1.35%
2023	107	+3.91%
Source: INSEE

== See also ==
- Communes of the Côte-d'Or department
