= Époisses =

French soft cheese

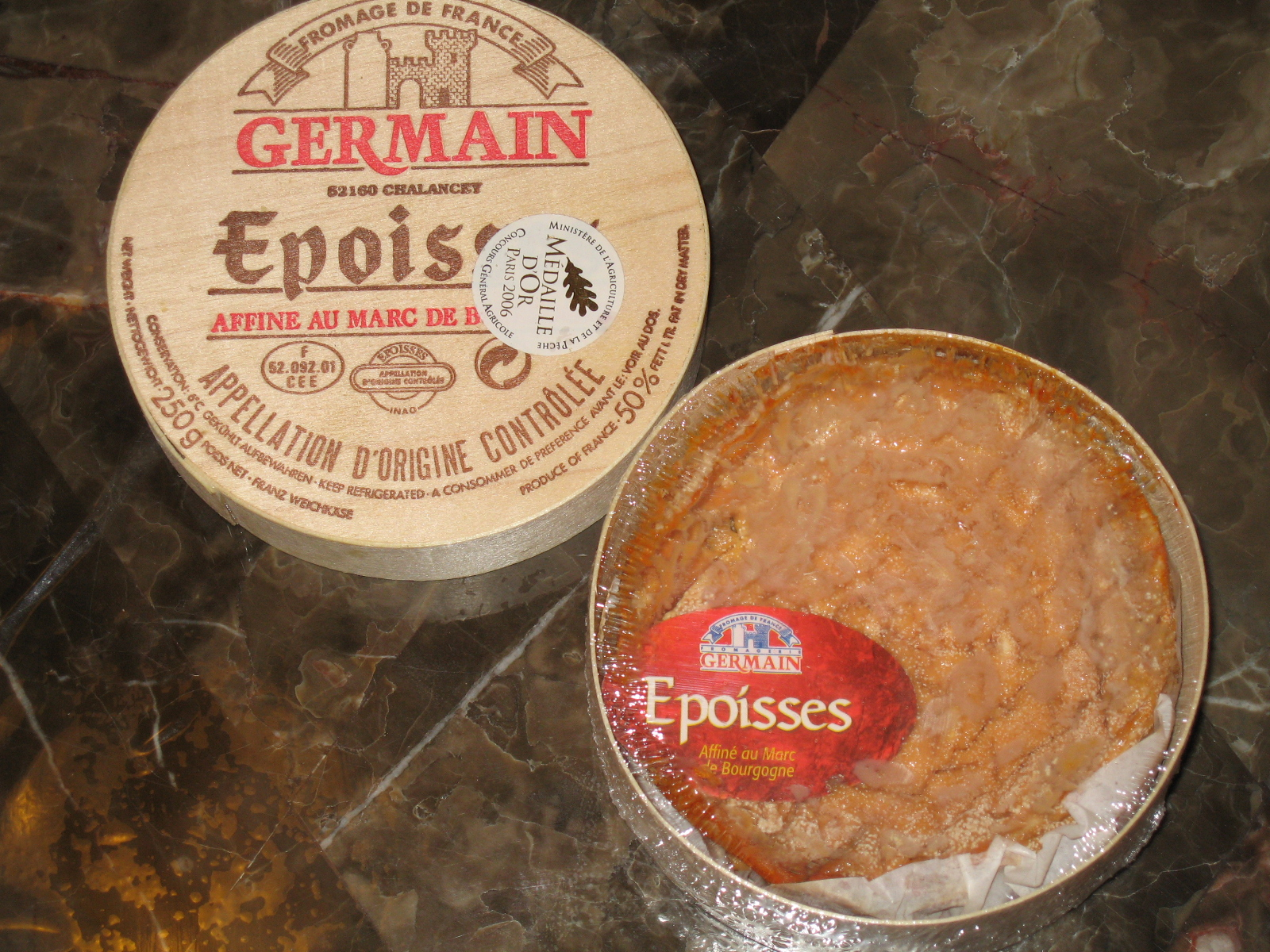
- Country of origin: France
- Region: Côte-d'Or
- Town: Époisses
- Source of milk: Cows
- Pasteurized: Some
- Texture: Soft, washed rind
- Aging time: At least six weeks
- Certification: French AOC 1991

Époisses (French pronunciation: [epwas]), also known as Époisses de Bourgogne (French: [epwas də buʁɡɔɲ]), is a legally demarcated cheese made in the village of Époisses and its environs, in the département of Côte-d'Or, about halfway between Dijon and Auxerre, in the former duchy of Burgundy, France, from agricultural processes and resources traditionally found in that region.

Époisses is a pungent soft-paste cow's-milk cheese. Smear-ripened, "washed rind" (washed in brine and Marc de Bourgogne, the local pomace brandy), it is circular at around either 10 cm (4 in) or 18 cm (7 in) in diameter, with a distinctive soft red-orange color. It is made either from raw or pasteurized milk, and is sold in a circular wooden box. The rind is edible.

== History ==
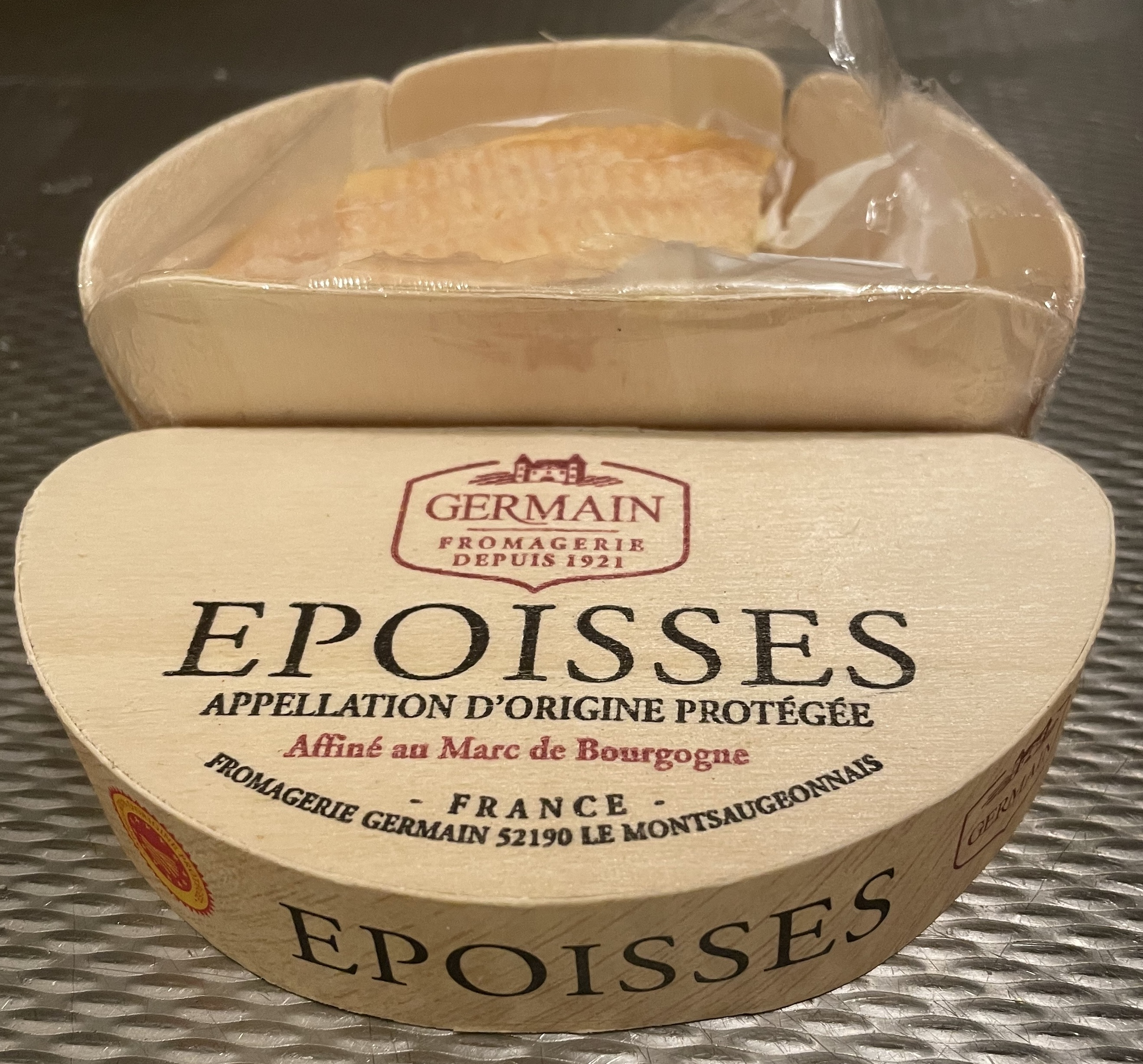
French cheese Époisses brand Germain in a box

At the start of the sixteenth century, the village was home to a community of Cistercians at Cîteaux Abbey that, according to oral legend, began production of the cheese. Two hundred years later, when the community left, local farmers inherited the recipe, which developed over the next century. Napoleon was particularly fond of the cheese. Production began to decline after the First World War, virtually ceasing by the 1950s.

In 1956 a small farming couple, Robert and Simone Berthaut, decided to re-launch the production of Époisses by mobilizing the traditional skills of those who still knew how to make the cheese. Berthaut Époisses increasingly gained favor among its devotees and became a spectacular success. The business is now carried on by their son, Jean Berthaut. Fromagerie Berthaut is currently responsible for the manufacture of all fermier Époisses, although several artisanal fromageries now also manufacture Époisses.

== Manufacture ==
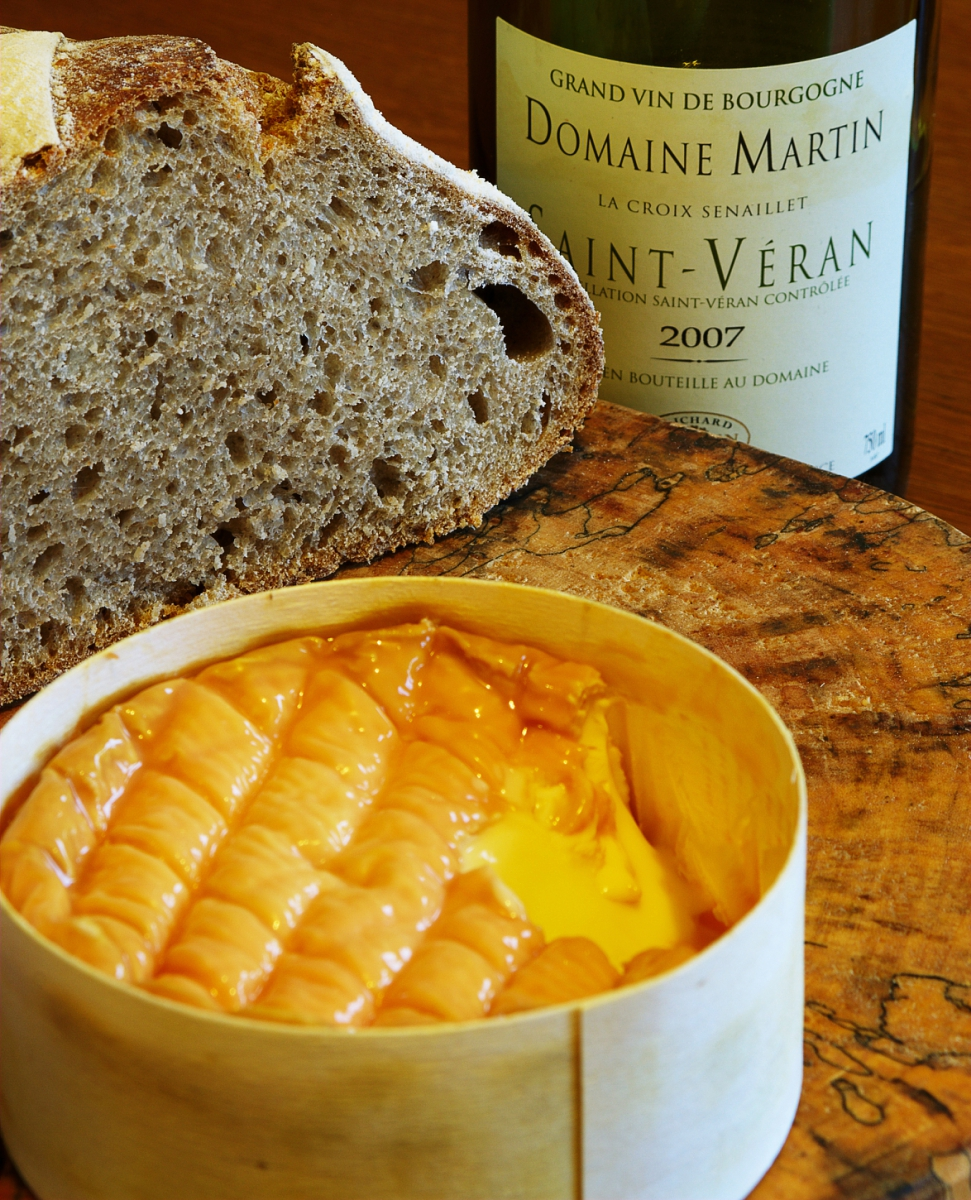
Époisses cheese and white wine with sourdough bread

At the first stage of manufacture, whole milk is heated to around 30 °C (86 °F) with the coagulation lasting for at least 16 hours. The fragile curds are drained in moulds, and the whey is allowed to run off. Around 48 hours later the cheese is removed, salted, and placed on racks to dry; once dry, it is moved to cellars to mature.

Each cheese is rinsed up to three times per week in a mixture of water and marc, and brushed by hand to spread the bacteria evenly over the surface. The yeast and fermenting agents produce the distinctive orange-red exterior, as it develops over a period of around six weeks.

In 1991, the cheese was awarded appellation d'origine contrôlée (AOC) status, which states that the manufacture must follow the following rules:

- The milk's coagulation must be performed by lactic acid and continue for 16 hours.
- The curd must be cut roughly as opposed to being broken.
- After drainage, only dry salt may be used.

Under AOC regulation, only cheese made in listed communes in the Côte-d'Or, Haute-Marne, and Yonne departments may bear the appellation.

== See also ==
- List of cheeses
