= Corrombles =

- Commune
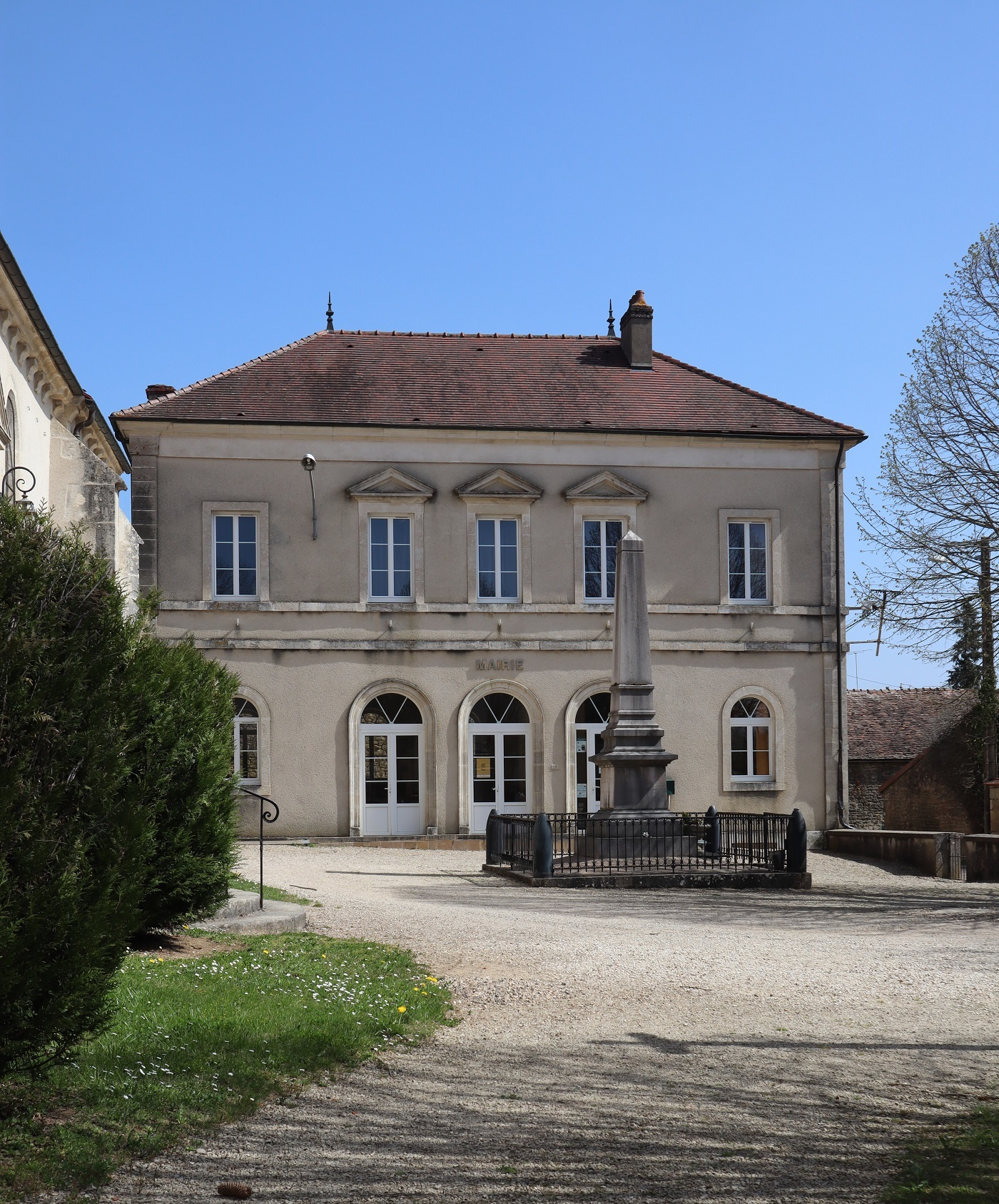
- Corrombles Town hall
- Location of Corrombles
- Location within France Location within Bourgogne-Franche-Comté
- Coordinates: 47°31′05″N 4°11′51″E
- Country: France
- Region: Bourgogne-Franche-Comté
- Department: Côte-d'Or
- Arrondissement: Montbard
- Canton: Semur-en-Auxois

Government
  - Mayor (2020–2026): Isabelle Bouhot
- Area^{1}: 11.46 km^{2} (4.42 sq mi)
- Elevation: 288 m (945 ft)
- Highest elevation: 331 m (1,086 ft)
- Lowest elevation: 239 m (784 ft)
- Population (2023): 241
  - Density: 21.0/km^{2} (54.5/sq mi)
- Time zone: UTC+01:00 (CET)
  - Summer (DST): UTC+02:00 (CEST)
- INSEE/Postal code: 21198 /21460
- ^{1} French Land Register data, which excludes lakes, ponds, glaciers > 1 km^{2} (0.386 sq mi or 247 acres) and river estuaries.

Corrombles (French pronunciation: [kɔʁɔ̃bl]) is a commune in the Côte-d'Or department in eastern France.

== Population ==
Historical population
Year	Pop.	±% p.a.
1968	270	—
1975	239	−1.73%
1982	200	−2.51%
1990	201	+0.06%
1999	201	+0.00%
2007	237	+2.08%
2012	242	+0.42%
2017	246	+0.33%
2023	241	−0.34%
Source: INSEE

== See also ==
- Communes of the Côte-d'Or department
