= Corsaint =

- Commune
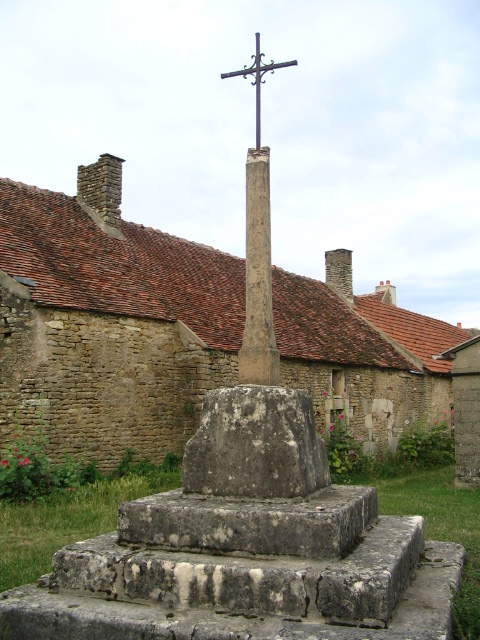
- The cross in the hamlet of Turley
- Location of Corsaint
- Location within France Location within Bourgogne-Franche-Comté
- Coordinates: 47°32′23″N 4°12′00″E
- Country: France
- Region: Bourgogne-Franche-Comté
- Department: Côte-d'Or
- Arrondissement: Montbard
- Canton: Semur-en-Auxois

Government
  - Mayor (2020–2026): Samuel Hopgood
- Area^{1}: 20.37 km^{2} (7.86 sq mi)
- Elevation: 320 m (1,050 ft)
- Highest elevation: 386 m (1,266 ft)
- Lowest elevation: 219 m (719 ft)
- Population (2023): 129
  - Density: 6.33/km^{2} (16.4/sq mi)
- Time zone: UTC+01:00 (CET)
  - Summer (DST): UTC+02:00 (CEST)
- INSEE/Postal code: 21199 /21460
- ^{1} French Land Register data, which excludes lakes, ponds, glaciers > 1 km^{2} (0.386 sq mi or 247 acres) and river estuaries.

Corsaint (French pronunciation: [kɔʁsɛ̃]) is a commune in the Côte-d'Or department in eastern France.

== Population ==
Historical population
Year	Pop.	±% p.a.
1968	147	—
1975	134	−1.31%
1982	148	+1.43%
1990	117	−2.90%
1999	128	+1.00%
2007	124	−0.40%
2012	150	+3.88%
2017	160	+1.30%
2023	129	−3.53%
Source: INSEE

== See also ==
- Communes of the Côte-d'Or department
