= Époisses, Côte-d'Or =

Époisses
- Commune
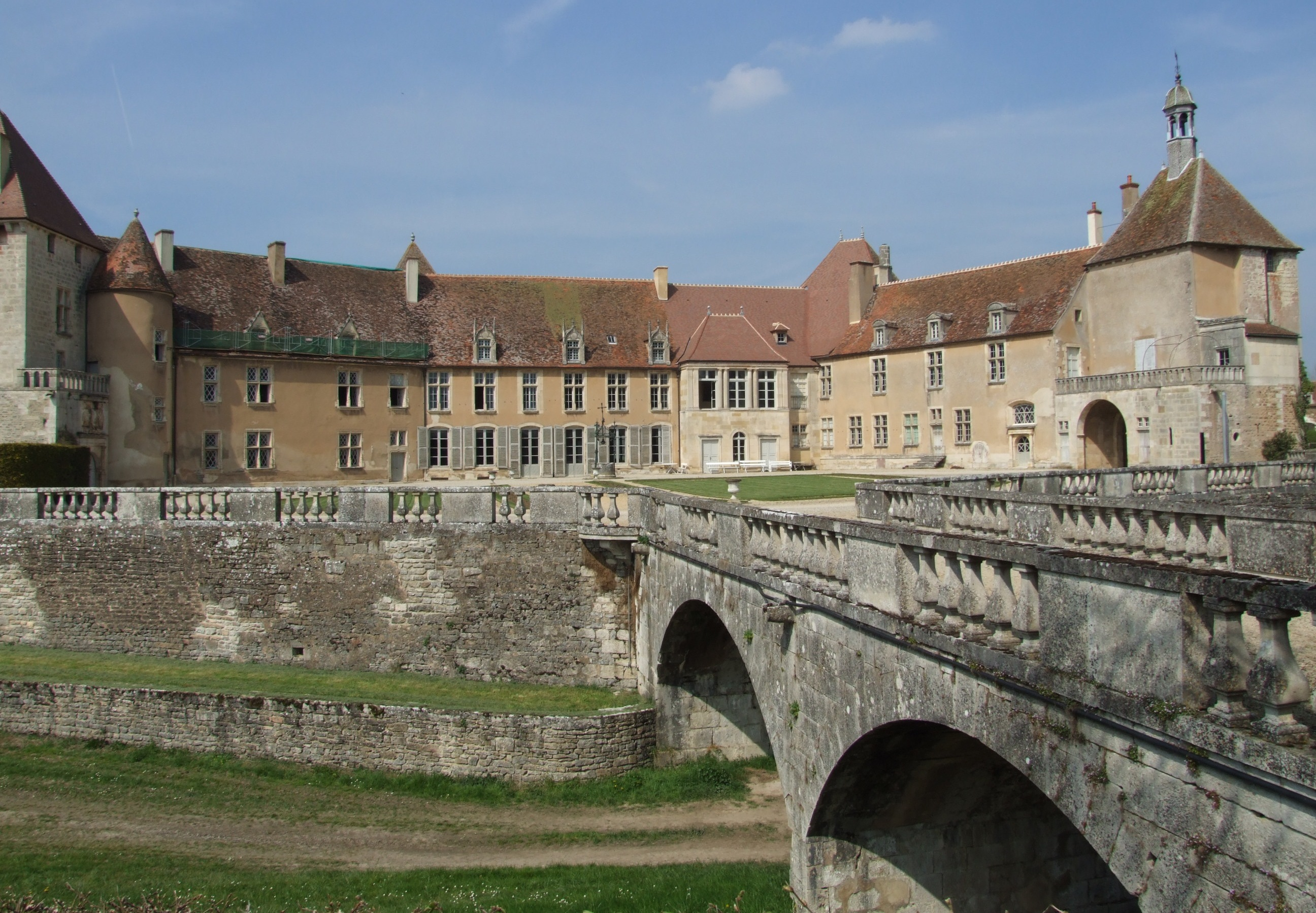
- Chateau

- Coat of arms
- Location of Époisses
- Location within France Location within Bourgogne-Franche-Comté
- Coordinates: 47°30′28″N 4°10′28″E
- Country: France
- Region: Bourgogne-Franche-Comté
- Department: Côte-d'Or
- Arrondissement: Montbard
- Canton: Semur-en-Auxois

Government
  - Mayor (2020–2026): Jean-Marie Virely
- Area^{1}: 21.72 km^{2} (8.39 sq mi)
- Elevation: 266 m (873 ft)
- Highest elevation: 321 m (1,053 ft)
- Lowest elevation: 233 m (764 ft)
- Population (2023): 715
  - Density: 32.9/km^{2} (85.3/sq mi)
- Time zone: UTC+01:00 (CET)
  - Summer (DST): UTC+02:00 (CEST)
- INSEE/Postal code: 21247 /21460
- ^{1} French Land Register data, which excludes lakes, ponds, glaciers > 1 km^{2} (0.386 sq mi or 247 acres) and river estuaries.

Époisses (French pronunciation: [epwas]) is a commune in the Côte-d'Or department in eastern France, located around halfway between Dijon and Auxerre.

The village is known for its Époisses cheese, a pungent unpasteurized cow's-milk cheese.

== Population ==
Historical population
Year	Pop.	±% p.a.
1968	696	—
1975	702	+0.12%
1982	820	+2.24%
1990	794	−0.40%
1999	721	−1.07%
2007	809	+1.45%
2012	771	−0.96%
2017	796	+0.64%
2023	715	−1.77%
Source: INSEE

== See also ==
- Communes of the Côte-d'Or department
