= Moutiers-Saint-Jean =

- Commune
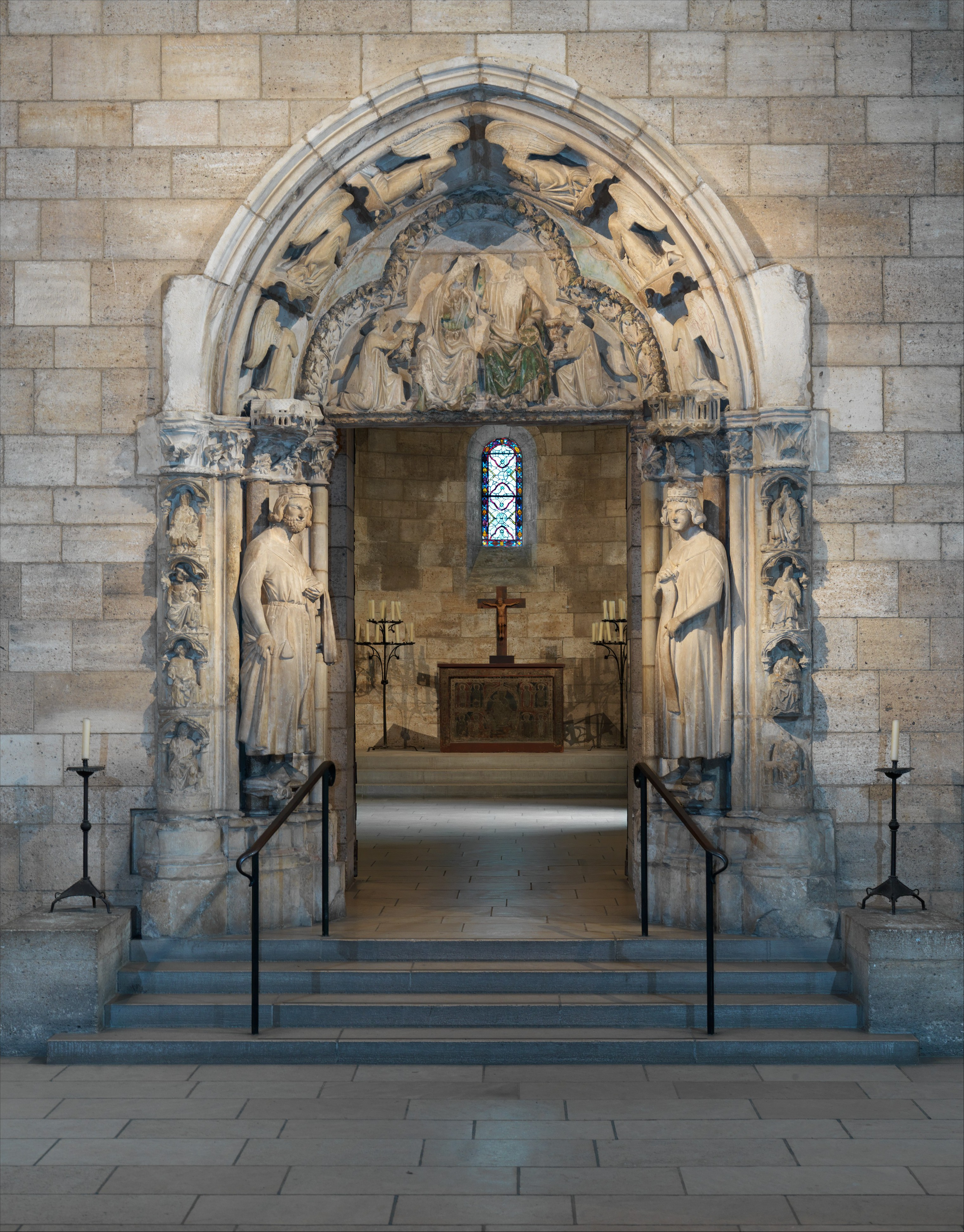
- The doorway portal from Moutiers-Saint-Jean Abbey, in The Cloisters

- Coat of arms
- Location of Moutiers-Saint-Jean
- Location within France Location within Bourgogne-Franche-Comté
- Coordinates: 47°33′45″N 4°13′15″E
- Country: France
- Region: Bourgogne-Franche-Comté
- Department: Côte-d'Or
- Arrondissement: Montbard
- Canton: Montbard

Government
  - Mayor (2020–2026): Vincent Farache
- Area^{1}: 4.96 km^{2} (1.92 sq mi)
- Elevation: 200 m (660 ft)
- Highest elevation: 338 m (1,109 ft)
- Lowest elevation: 216 m (709 ft)
- Population (2023): 254
  - Density: 51.2/km^{2} (133/sq mi)
- Time zone: UTC+01:00 (CET)
  - Summer (DST): UTC+02:00 (CEST)
- INSEE/Postal code: 21446 /21500
- ^{1} French Land Register data, which excludes lakes, ponds, glaciers > 1 km^{2} (0.386 sq mi or 247 acres) and river estuaries.

Moutiers-Saint-Jean (French pronunciation: [mutje sɛ̃ ʒɑ̃]) is a commune in the Côte-d'Or department in eastern France. It is named after the monastery of Saint John of Réôme.

== Population ==
Historical population
Year	Pop.	±% p.a.
1968	286	—
1975	315	+1.39%
1982	292	−1.08%
1990	265	−1.21%
1999	250	−0.65%
2007	260	+0.49%
2012	249	−0.86%
2017	256	+0.56%
2023	254	−0.13%
Source: INSEE

== See also ==
- Communes of the Côte-d'Or department
