= Entry of Christ into Jerusalem (disambiguation) =

The Entry of Christ into Jerusalem, and variations thereon, is the title of several artworks depicting the biblical episode of the triumphal entry into Jerusalem, a standard scene in cycles of the Life of Christ. Paintings of this subject include the following:

- Entry of Christ into Jerusalem (Master of Taüll), a twelfth-century fresco
- Entry of Christ into Jerusalem (van Dyck), a seventeenth-century oil painting
- Entry of Christ into Jerusalem (Karousos), an eighteenth-century painting in tempera
- Christ's Entry into Jerusalem (Haydon), a nineteenth-century oil painting
