= San Baudelio de Berlanga =

Coordinates: 41.4183°N 2.79028°W

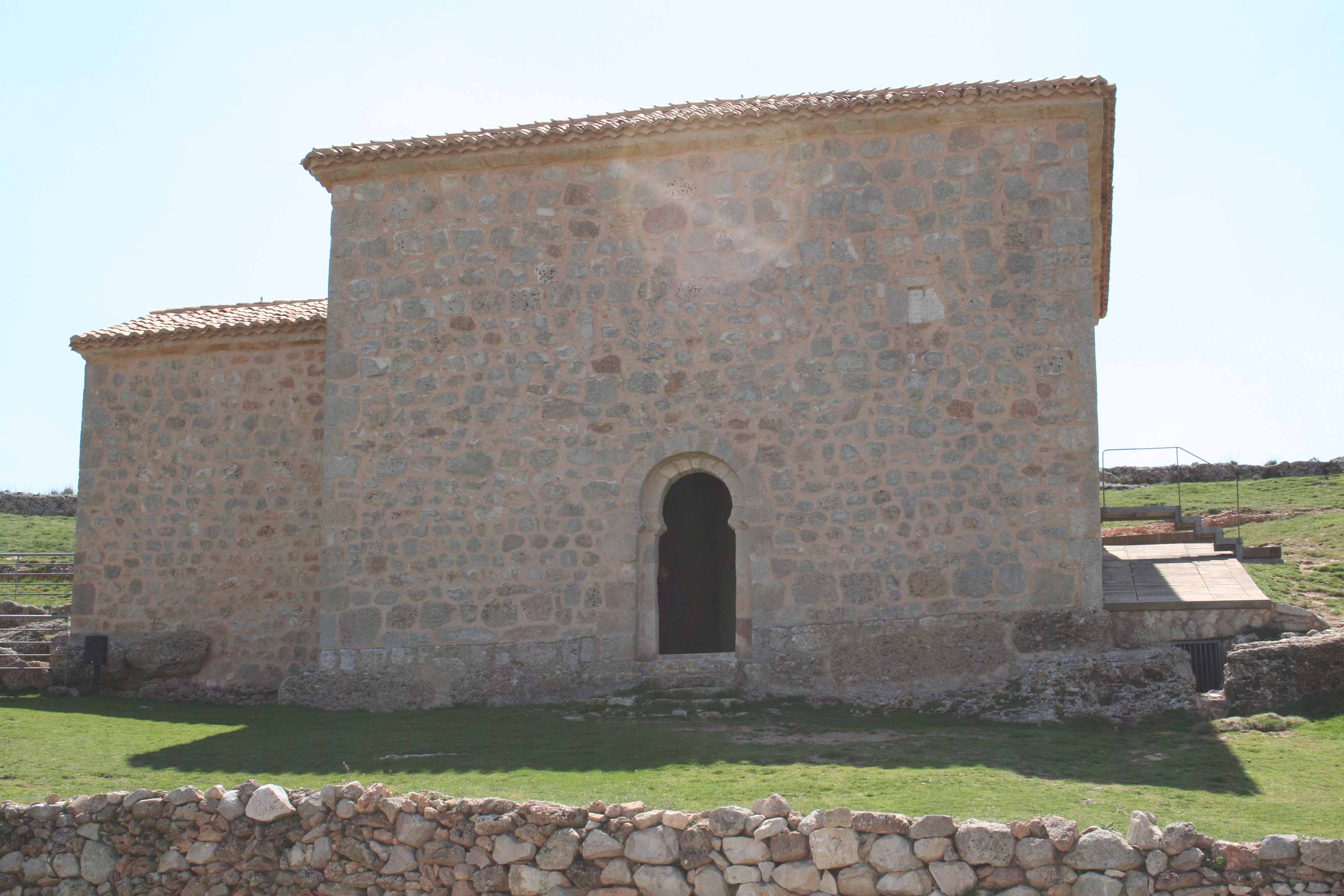
Frontal view of San Baudelio de Berlanga.

The Hermitage of San Baudelio de Berlanga (Ermita de San Baudelio de Berlanga) is an early 11th-century church at Caltojar in the province of Soria, Castile and León, Spain, 8 km south of Berlanga de Duero. It is an important example of Mozarabic architecture for its peculiarities, and was built in the 11th century, in what was then the frontier between Islamic and Christian lands. It is dedicated to Saint Baudilus or Baudel.

The construction of the hermitage is part of the period of the definitive consolidation of the Christian kingdoms throughout this area, which takes place around the year 1060, when the taking takes place, by Ferdinand I of León, of several towns including Berlanga.

== History ==
Declared a national monument in 1917, The Hermitage of San Baudelio de Berlanga is thought to have been built to honor Saint Baudilus, or San Baudelio as he is known in Spanish. Saint Baudilus was a monk who lived during the second or third century in Nîmes and is mentioned in two twelfth-century documents.

Legends about Saint Baudilus say that he earned the crown of martyrdom after preaching the gospel to local townspeople celebrating the birth of Jupiter, and that after his execution by decapitation with an axe, wells sprang up at the location of his death. It is unknown what direct connection San Baudelio had with this chapel made in his honor, if any, though the movement of the cult of San Baudelio into Spain was probably responsible for its creation. Saint Baudilus died in the late third or fourth century.

A small adjoining cave is still accessible inside the southwestern wall of the sanctuary, where a hermit may have lived at one point, and locals still make pilgrimage to a freshwater spring near the church each year on May 20 (his feast day) to pay respects to Saint Baudilus, who also had miraculous cures named after him in earlier centuries. An axe and a palm tree are the symbols of his martyrdom, and the palm can be seen as a direct inspiration to the unique architecture of San Baudelio de Berlanga.

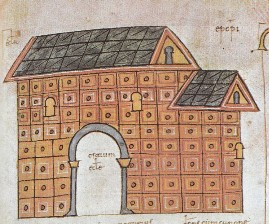
A Toledo church in Codex Vigilanus.

In the tenth century as the power of the Moors was diminishing in the North, it is probable that a hermit monk took refuge in the lonely cave in the Spanish countryside. His status could have drawn visitors with offerings and companionship, which may have been the catalyst for the building of the hermitage church. At the approximate time of the building of the chapel, local craftsmen, mostly from Castile, would have been Mozarabs. This would account for the heavy Mozarabic influence on the architecture. Also, San Baudelio closely correlates with a church pictured in the Codex Vigilanus (A. D. 976), approximating the construction of the hermitage to the late tenth or early eleventh century.

One of the most remarkable aspects is its pictorial decoration, as it is one of the important examples of Romanesque painting in Spain. Only a few remains of tempera painting remain, since the originals were torn and exported in 1926 to different museums of the United States despite the protection of the hermitage as « national monument » of Spain in 1917 generating a huge scandal since the uprooting was considered to be looting. (Cincinnati Museum of Art, New York Cloisters Museum, Boston Museum of Fine Arts and the Indianapolis Museum of Art). Some are also in the Prado Museum, specifically six scenes. Of the paintings that came out to United States we have: The Dromedary, The healing of the blind and The resurrection of Lazarus, The Temptation of Christ, The three Marys before the tomb, The Holy Supper, The wedding of Cana, Entrance to Jerusalem and the Falconer. In 1957 the Spanish government exchanged some of these paintings for the Fuentidueña Apse of the Romanesque church of San Martín of the Castilian town of Fuentidueña, which today is preserved in the Metropolitan Museum of New York, the paintings thus acquired were deposited in the Prado Museum. Among those found in Spain we have: Hunt deer, Hare hunting, The warrior, The elephant, The bear and The hunter. In 1965 the works of restoration of the paintings that were still in the church and that had not been removed were carried out.

== Architecture and Construction ==
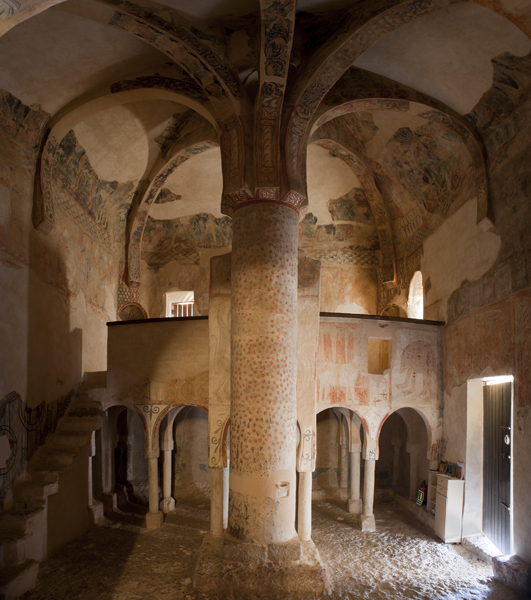
Current view of the Central pillar of San Baudelio de Berlanga.

No records provide evidence of the construction of the church, but it is apparent that it belongs to the group of Mozarabic churches built throughout northern Spain during the tenth and eleventh centuries. San Baudelio sets itself apart from the rest of the architecture in the Castile region because it is an uncommon example of the Mozarabic style, rather than the much more numerous examples of Moorish influenced architecture from Andalusia, which are found farther west in León.

The lack of information on the church force it to be dated based on its architectural influences and construction, as well as through the paintings that once lined the interior of the small chapel.

San Baudelio de Berlanga is a relatively plain building on the outside, being mostly square with a small, nearly square apse adjoining its east side. The walls of the entire structure are made of rough native stone, and its exterior offers no decoration whatsoever. The interior, however, is very distinctive, and has been described as "The most Mohammedan church in the whole of Spain."

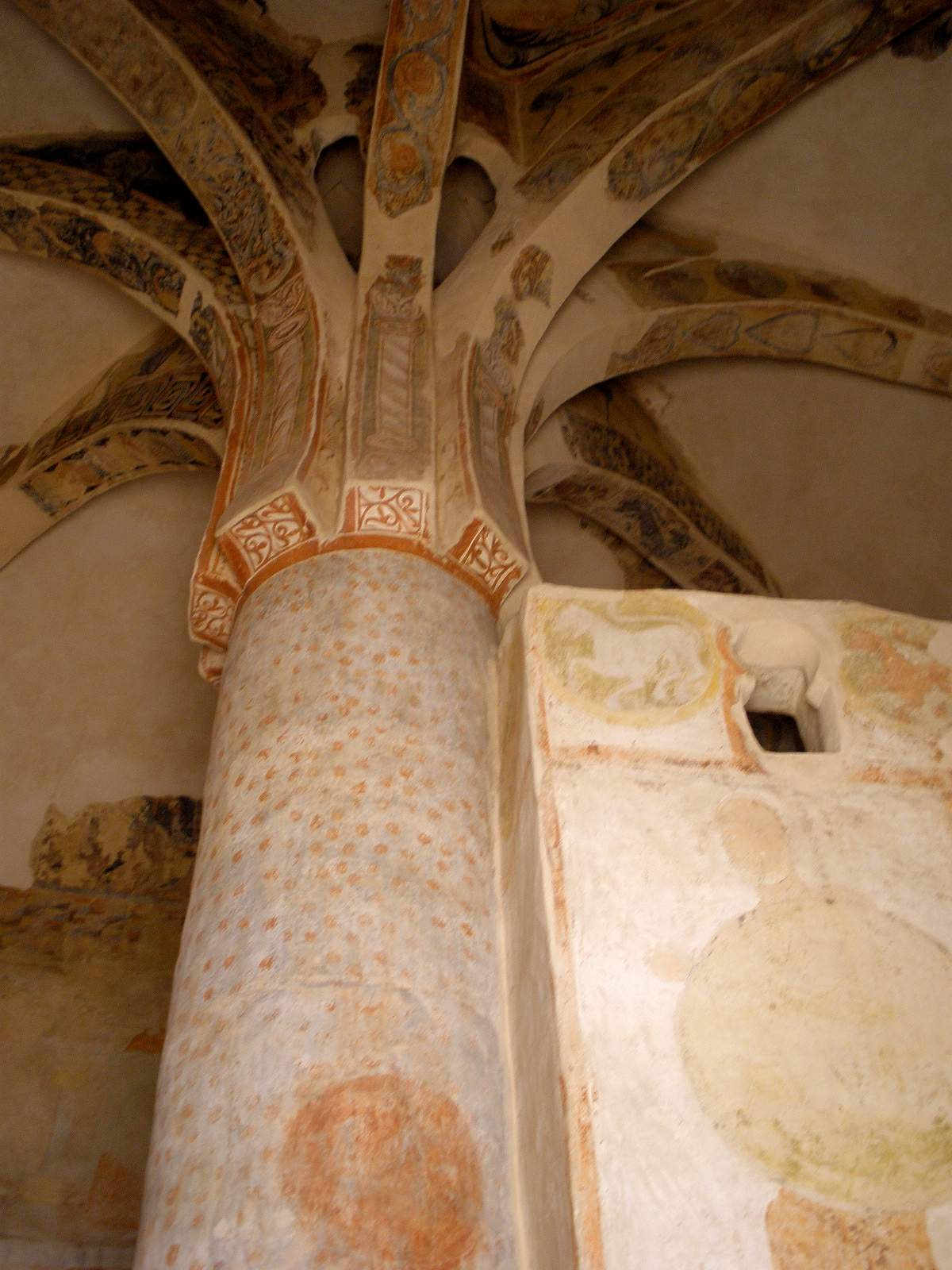
Hollow lantern space with small oratory behind central pillar.

The entrance to San Baudelio de Berlanga is a single horseshoe-arched door on the north wall of the building, which leads directly into the nave of the church. Upon entering the hermitage, visitors are greeted by a large circular pillar that rises to the vaults of the apse. From the top of the pillar project eight ribbed arches, which are supported at the four corners and middle of the walls of the church. These arches are horseshoe forms with corner ribs supported by small Moorish inspired squinches.

Similar to the palm tree, which symbolizes Saint Baudilus, it is not unlikely that this central column was designed by an architect to represent a palm tree, attribute of the Saint. Atop the pillar, in between the sprouting arches, is a small cavity, which is believed to be a place where treasures of the church or relics of its saint were once secured. The interior of this space is ribbed in Moorish style, with crisscrossing arches around a domed top, similar to the vaulted dome of the nearby hermitage of San Miguel Almazan.

Another unusual feature of San Baudelio de Berlanga is its gallery, which spans the interior side of the west wall. This tribune is constructed of a double row of horseshoe arches, which support a Choir area on the second floor, accessible by the stairs on the south wall. Projecting into the nave, and supported by the tribune, is a small oratory, which sits directly against the nave's central pillar. This small chapel is barrel vaulted, and has a window on either of its sides. It is no larger than a pulpit.

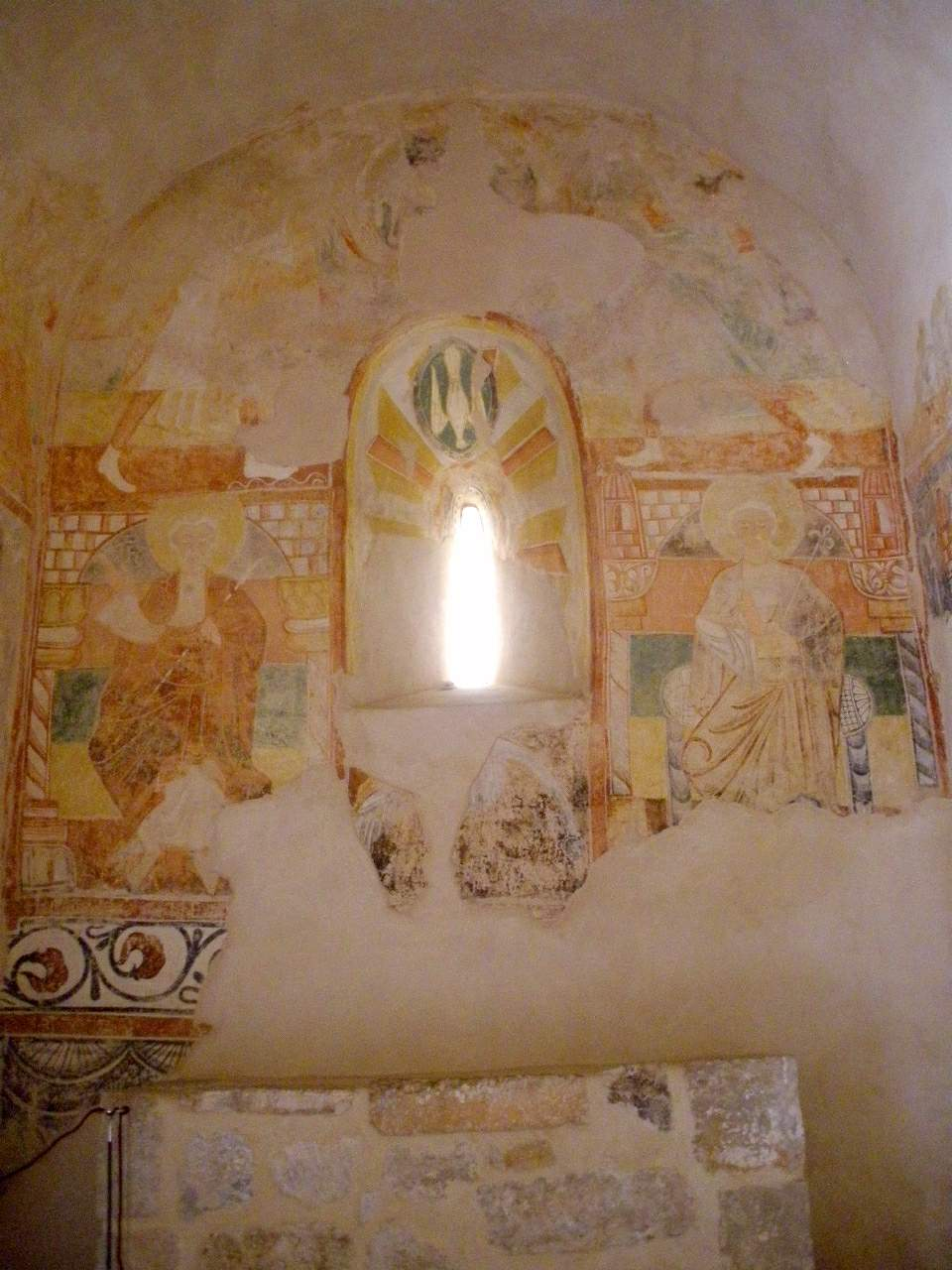
Current view of a loophole window on east wall.

The apsidal chapel, which joins the main building on its eastern side, is accessible through another horseshoe arched doorway, and sits four steps higher than the floor of the nave. At its back wall is a small loophole shaped window, which until it was closed off, would have allowed morning light to enter the chapel. This room is also barrel vaulted, and almost identical in size and shape to the chapel of the hermitage of San Cruz at Maderuelo.

One other unique aspect of San Baudelio de Berlanga is its connection to a small cave that lies under the hill on which the church sits. Access to this cave is gained through a doorway under the tribune, against the south wall. This is the cave in which a hermit may have lived at one time, possibly before the construction of the church.

The only natural means of light in the church would have been through the open doorway on the North wall, a now closed up window also found on the North wall, or a small window on the West wall that was converted from a doorway, which would have been an alternate entrance into the oratory.

Elements of San Baudelio, like the double rows of pillars and arches, recall the stylistic elements of the Great Mosque of Cordova. The ribbed arches, squinches or niches beneath the arches, and the method of construction in the lantern are all apparently derived from areas like Syria, Mesopotamia, and Armenia in the Near East. Not all the oriental aesthetics that occur in Spanish churches were introduced by the Moors. Many had already been introduced to Spain during Visigothic times through its commercial and ecclesiastical connections with the Near East. The use of rectangular frames around arches and intersecting ribbed vaults at San Baudelio was originally inspired by the extension of the mosque of Cordoba by Al-Hakam II, and it can also be seen in the church at San Millan de La Cogolla.

== Wall paintings ==
The hermitage housed many fine Romanesque frescoes from about 1125; most of these have been removed, but some have remained. Two sections, transferred to canvas, are now in the Indianapolis Museum of Art, showing the Entry of Christ into Jerusalem and the Wedding at Cana. Other sections, including The Healing of the Blind Man and the Raising of Lazarus and The Temptation of Christ are in the Metropolitan Museum of Art in New York, and in the Prado. The paintings are considered the work of three anonymous local artists. All decorative motifs on arches and vaults, as well as the large biblical scenes and the paintings on the apse, are attributed to the Master of Maderuelos, or First Master of Casillas. The hunting scenes of the lower areas, which are the most original, are attributed to the Master of San Baudelio. A third master of more modest proficiency is considered the author of the paintings inside the choir. [The paintings were done by the Catalan Master of Tahull (Taüll in Catalan), whose best known works are in Sant Climent de Taüll and the Museu Nacional d'Art de Catalunya in Barcelona, with two other painters.]? The scenes of the Life of Christ are unusual in Spanish painting at this period; these are in American museums, while smaller elements including scenes of hunting and falconry and decorative copies of textiles are in Madrid as well as New York. The frescoes include that of a camel and of a war elephant, which were inspired by Muslim motifs.

=== Frescoes ===
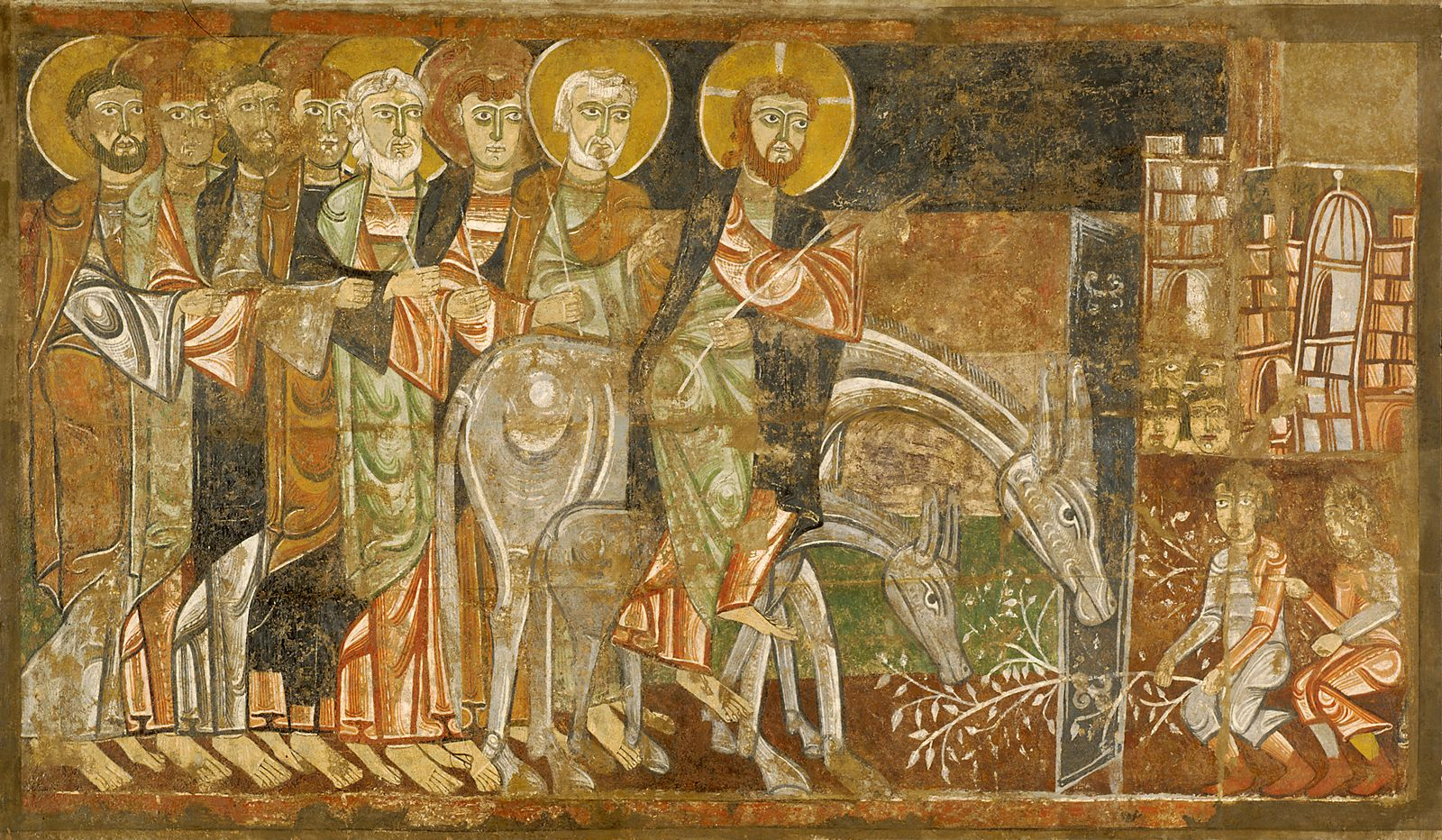
Entry of Christ into Jerusalem, now in Indianapolis

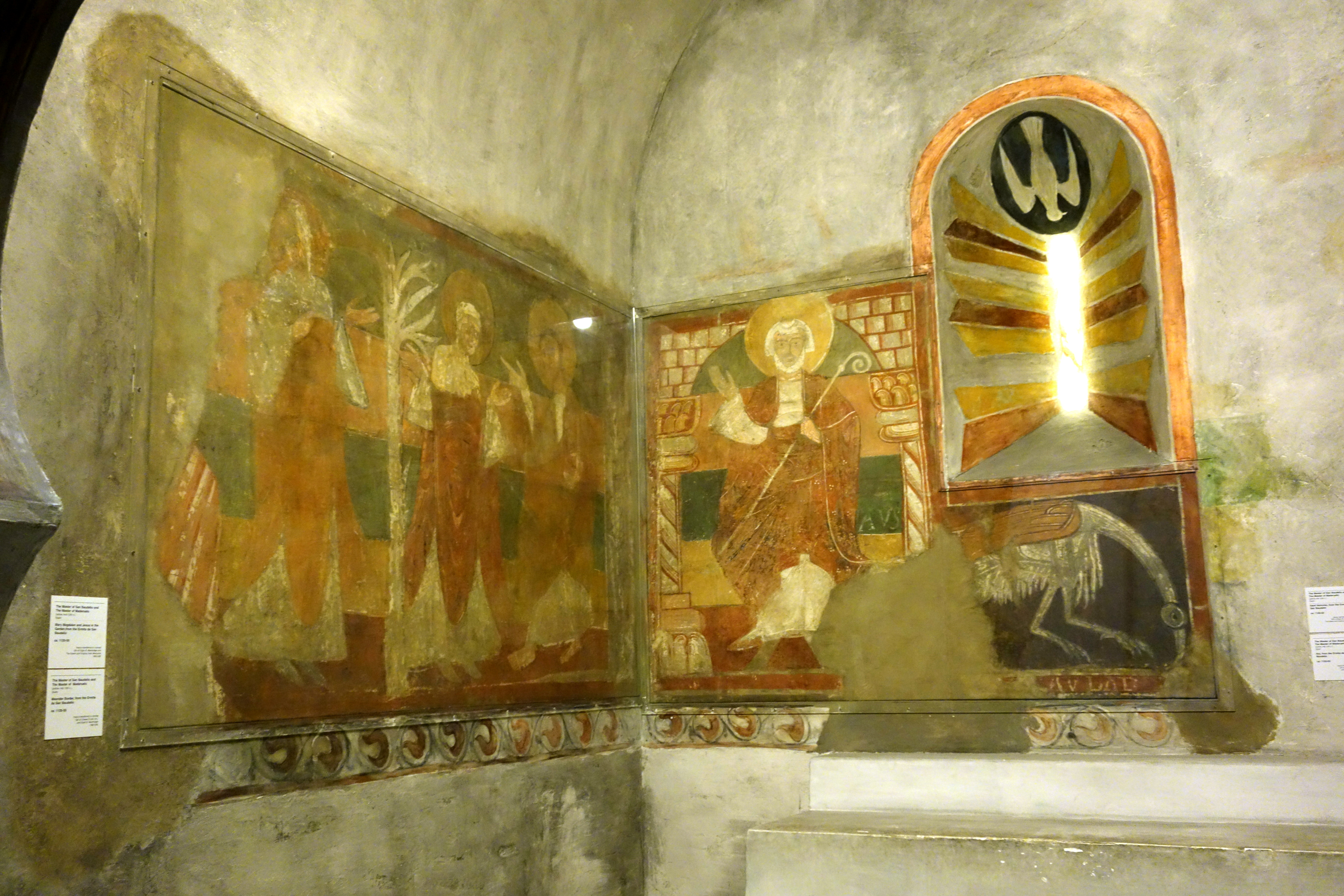
Mary Magdalen and Jesus in the Garden, now in Ohio

Originally every part of the church was covered with some kind of decoration. We can still see some of the remaining art work even though it has been eroded because of neglect or water seeping through the walls and loosening the plaster. Twenty-two compositions were removed from the church and brought to the United States and the Museo del Prado Madrid. Compared to other churches in Western Europe with painted interiors, San Baudelio is one of the best preserved from the Romanesque period. There are three main sections of decoration: the first two are narratives and secular motifs; the large compositions from the vaults and the walls from the main body of the building; these have been largely removed. The third group, too damaged to be removed, are left inside the small oratory of the tribune.

Under the lunette of the apse, there are two figures sitting under arches: St. Nicholas on the left of the window and Saint Baudilus at the right. We know it is Saint Baudilus because of the inscription BAVDILI(VS) even though some of the lower part of the image is missing. St. Nicholas is identified by the inscription (NICOL)AVS and under him the words IN D€I NOMINE can be seen. St. Nicholas is depicted sitting on a pillowed chair with a luminous cloud or a halo surrounding him. Some of his features include tonsured white hair and beard, an alb, a red mantle over the alb, and sandals. He is holding a crozier in his left hand and his right palm is raised outward. Both figures are placed against a striped background of what looks like faded teal green, pale red, forest green, yellow, and dark red. Under the window appears a long-legged, long necked bird, with a white body, and yellow and red wings. The ibis is painted against a dark red background, below it is inscribed: . . . E . . . AVLA DE(I).

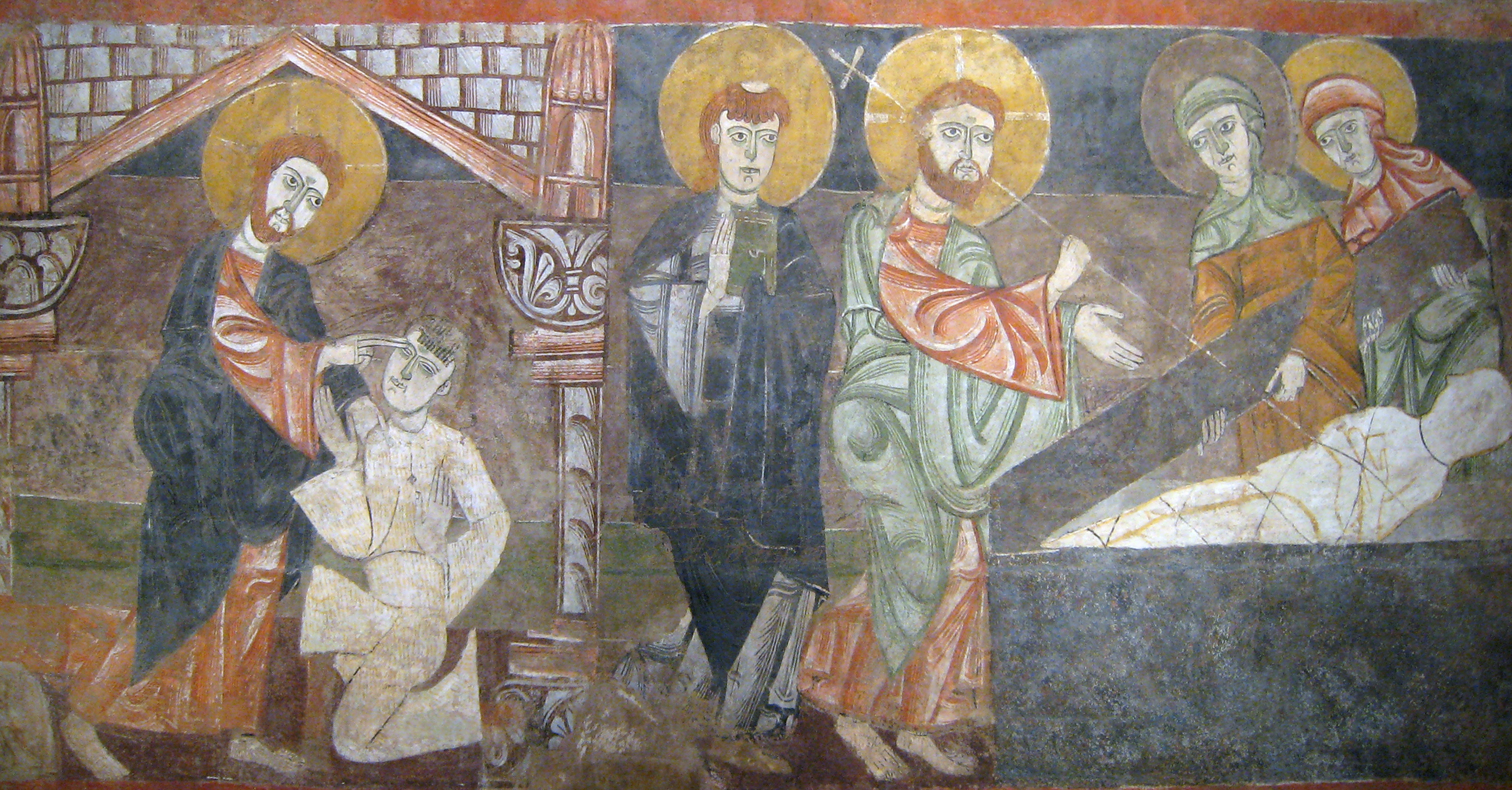
Raising Lazarus. Now in The Cloisters Museum, New York.

Around the seventeenth century the interior of the church was completely white washed due to the severe state of deterioration of the murals. But, a single piece was eventually found and transferred to canvas and it is still possible to identify the figure.

The north wall contains two scenes. They are separated by a tree, and the image on the right is better preserved. The image at the right of the tree appears to portray the meeting of Mary Magdalene and Jesus in the garden after the resurrection, it might also be the instance "she turned herself back, and saw Jesus standing, and knew not that it was Jesus," or "Jesus saith unto her, Mary. She turned herself, and saith unto him, Rabboni; which is to say, Master. Jesus saith unto her, Touch me not; for I am not yet ascended to my Father:" (John 20:17) Mary Magdalene is depicted with a halo surrounding her, white headdress and tunic, and red mantle. Jesus is dressed in a long white tunic and brown mantle and carries a book in his left hand (presumably the bible.) Of the image at the left of the tree only a single female figure is preserved. Dressed in a long white tunic and orange mantle, the female shrinks backward in astonishment and observes a figure to the left. Of the figure on her left only a small piece of orange red cloth is preserved. There is nothing to indicate what scene it is other than the adjoining figures to the right of the tree; it might represent another encounter of the meeting of Jesus and Mary Magdalene in the garden.

The murals in the vaulting of the church are almost all gone. There are a few fragments left that contained scenes from the life of the Christ and the Virgin: The Adoration of the Magi, Adoration of the Shepherds, Circumcision, The flight into Egypt, and probably the Annunciation and Presentation in the Temple.

On the south wall are some scenes of Jesus's miracles. One of these depicts him healing the blind man. Jesus, shown with short red hair and a beard, a large cross, and a halo surrounding him. He wears an orange tunic and a blue mantle. He touches the eyes of the blind man that kneels before him. The blind man is wearing a long white tunic, red hose, and has short dark hair. His blindness is symbolized by closed eyes.

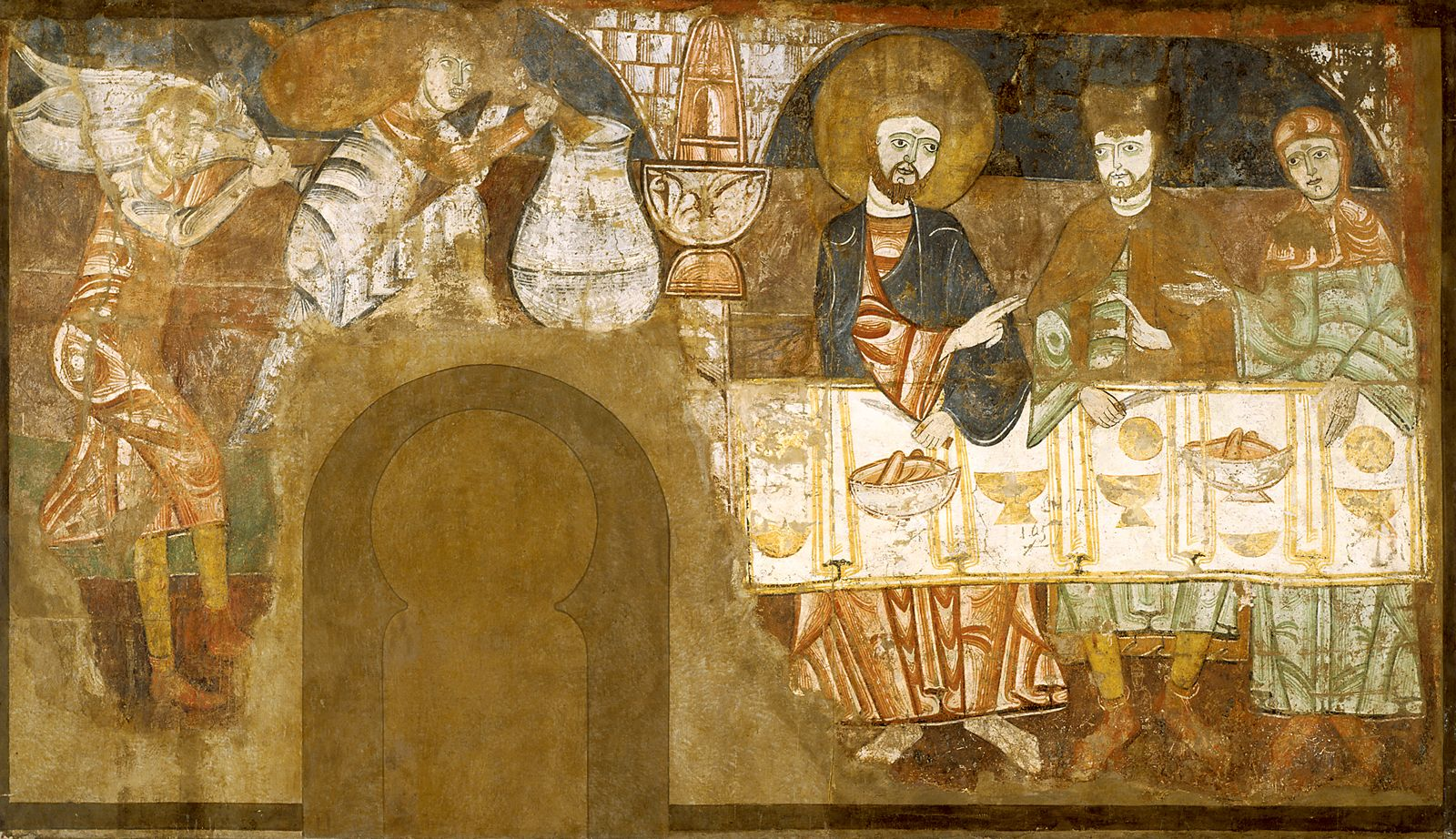
The Wedding at Cana. Now in Indianapolis.

Also appearing in the same space as the blind man is the Resurrection of Lazarus, one of the best preserved of the series. Lazarus, is shown wrapped up like a mummy and placed in a black sarcophagus. Two seemingly holy women lift one end of the cover. Jesus touches the body of Lazarus with a long staff, which turns into a cross, and he is joined by a beardless figure with red hair, possibly St. John, who is holding a green book in his left hand. Jesus is shown with a yellow-crossed nimbus, red hair, and pointed beard, and he wears an orange tunic with wide sleeves under a green mantle. The disciple at the left, also depicted with red hair, is wearing a long grey tunic and dark blue mantle. Both the women have halos and they wear pale green-orange headdresses that fall over the shoulders. The background is divided by wide stripes of dark blue, violet, red, and green.

The next miracle, the Marriage at Cana, takes up half the space on the left on the west wall. The composition is disrupted by a doorway and is sectioned by a column. Jesus, the bridegroom and bride are seated at the feast. The table is shown covered with a white cloth and has circular loaves of bread and bowls of fruit. Jesus, at the left, is holding a knife in his left hand and blesses with his right hand. As in the previous scene, Jesus is depicted with nimbus and dark red hair and beard, and is dressed in a long red tunic and dark blue mantle. The bearded bridegroom, who is holding a knife in his right hand and lifts his left hand in a gesture of speech, wears a tall hat, pale green tunic with an orange lining, brown mantle, light brown hose, and red sandals. The bride, who is seated at the right, is dressed in an orange headdress, a pale green robe with wide sleeves, and raises her right hand with her palm turned outward.

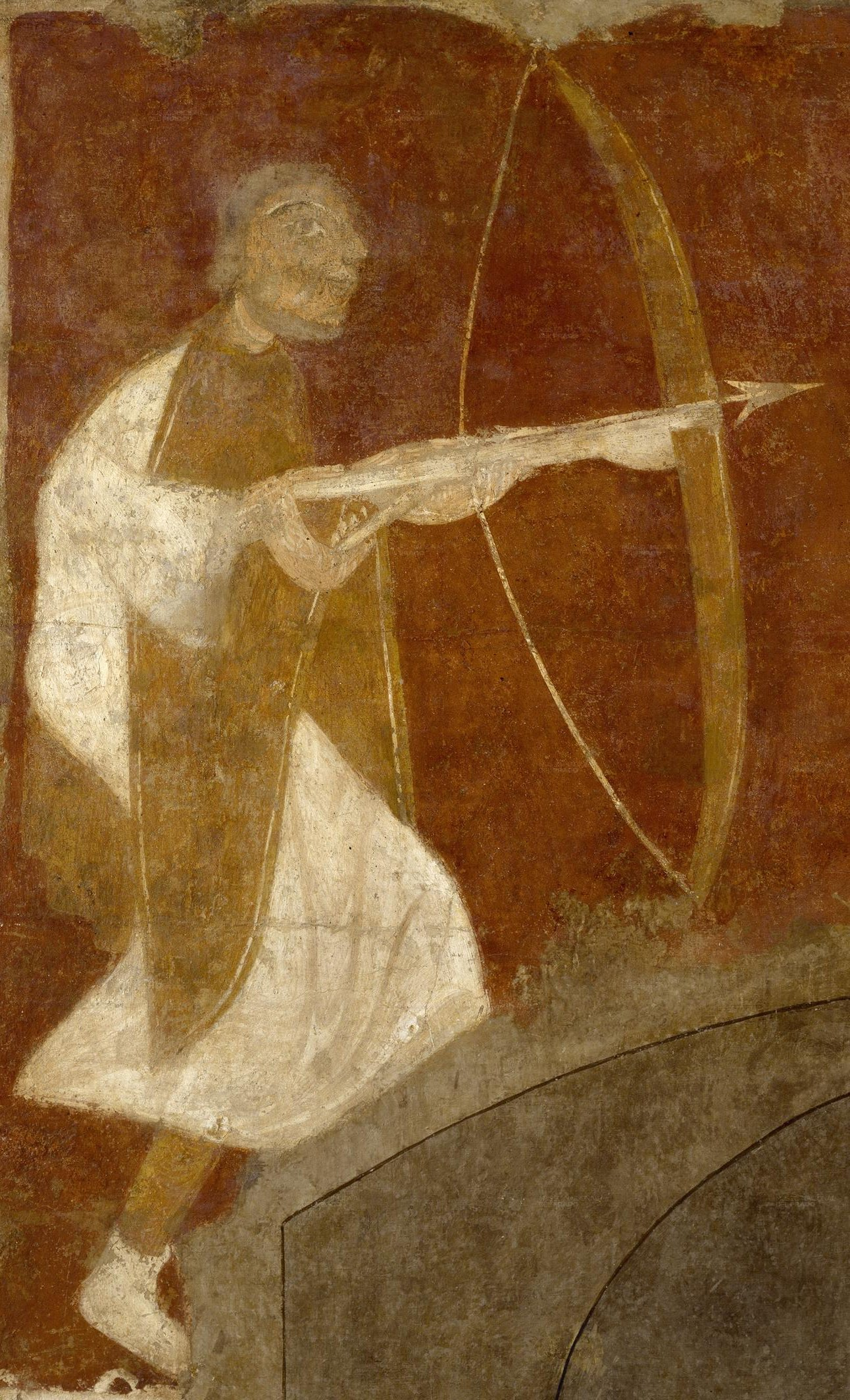
Hunting with a crossbow. Remain inside the hermitage.

The remaining piece of the west wall contains a portrayal of the Temptation of Christ in the Wilderness, and in this scene he appears twice. At the left he is shown at the moment when Satan states "If thou be the Son of God, command that these stones be made bread." The devil, depicted with long horns, wings, and a human body with claw feet, drops three large stones to the ground. Jesus, wearing a long orange tunic and dark blue mantle, holds up his left hand with palm outward in a sign of refusal. In the following scene Jesus is portrayed on a pinnacle of the temple. Here the devil is shown with human feet, wings, and a bearded animal-like head with long locks. Jesus is dressed as before and the temple is symbolized by a small building with circular windows and a gable roof. On the right, one of the angels who came to minister unto him speaks with a third demon, who appears to be half animal and half human. The body of the last devil is yellow and he has long hair and a pointed beard. The ugliness of the demons strike a sharp contrast to the poetic portrayal of the figure of Jesus.

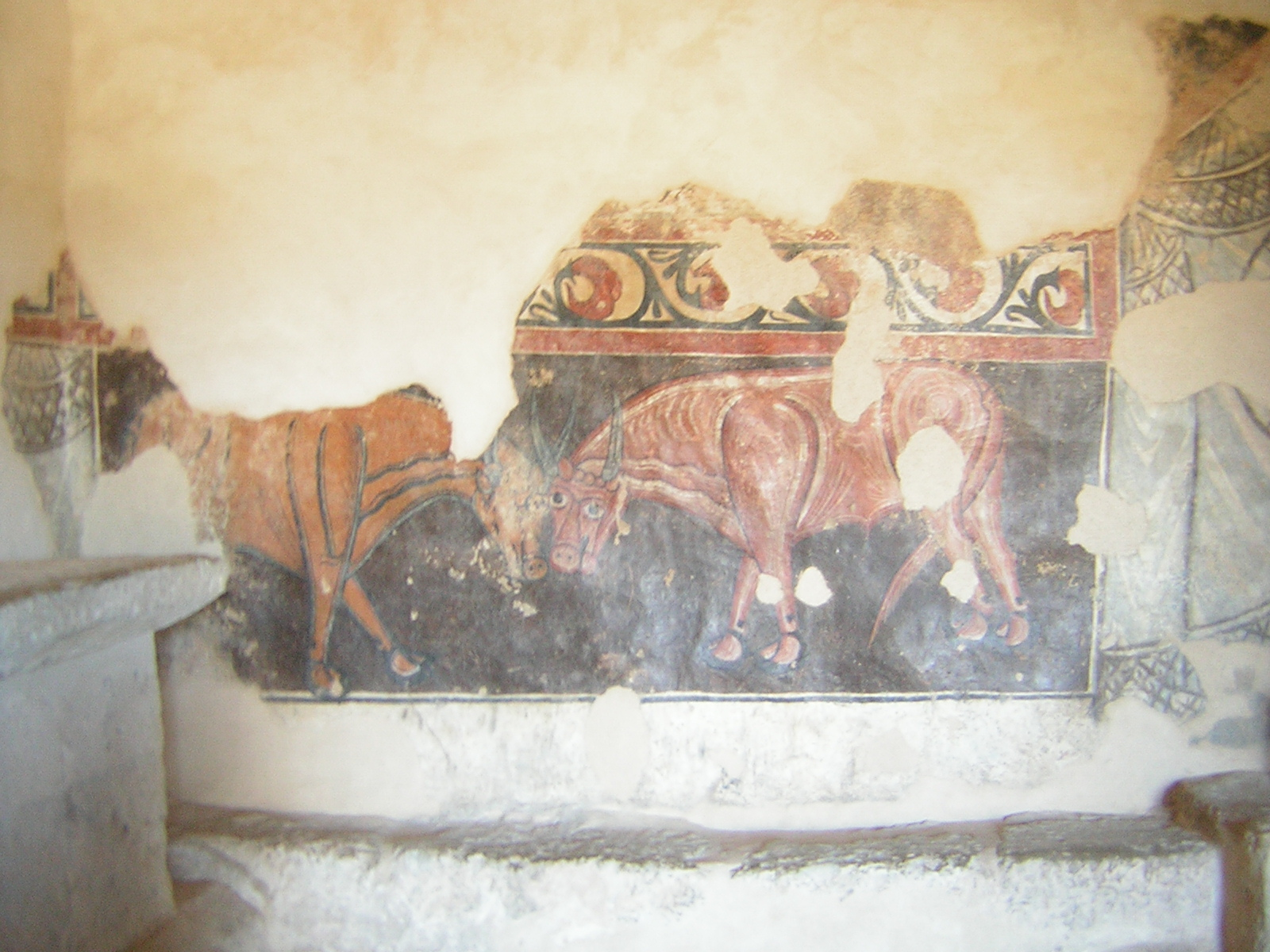
Bovine. Remain inside the hermitage.

The sequence of Christ's Passion starts at the north wall with Christ's entrance into Jerusalem. Jerusalem is symbolized at the right by a structure with an open door. Above are crenelated walls with windows. Outside awaiting Christ are two boys in red and blue tunics holding olive branches in their hands. Jesus rides on the donkey side-saddle in eastern fashion, approaching from the left. He has a halo with a cross, red hair, and beard, a teal tunic and a dark blue mantle. With his right hand he blesses as he holds a palm branch in his left hand. A baby horse accompanies the donkey Jesus is riding. Behind him follow the Apostles. We can see seven full Apostles with Peter, who is depicted here with white hair and a beard, leading the group. The red-headed St. John follows him.

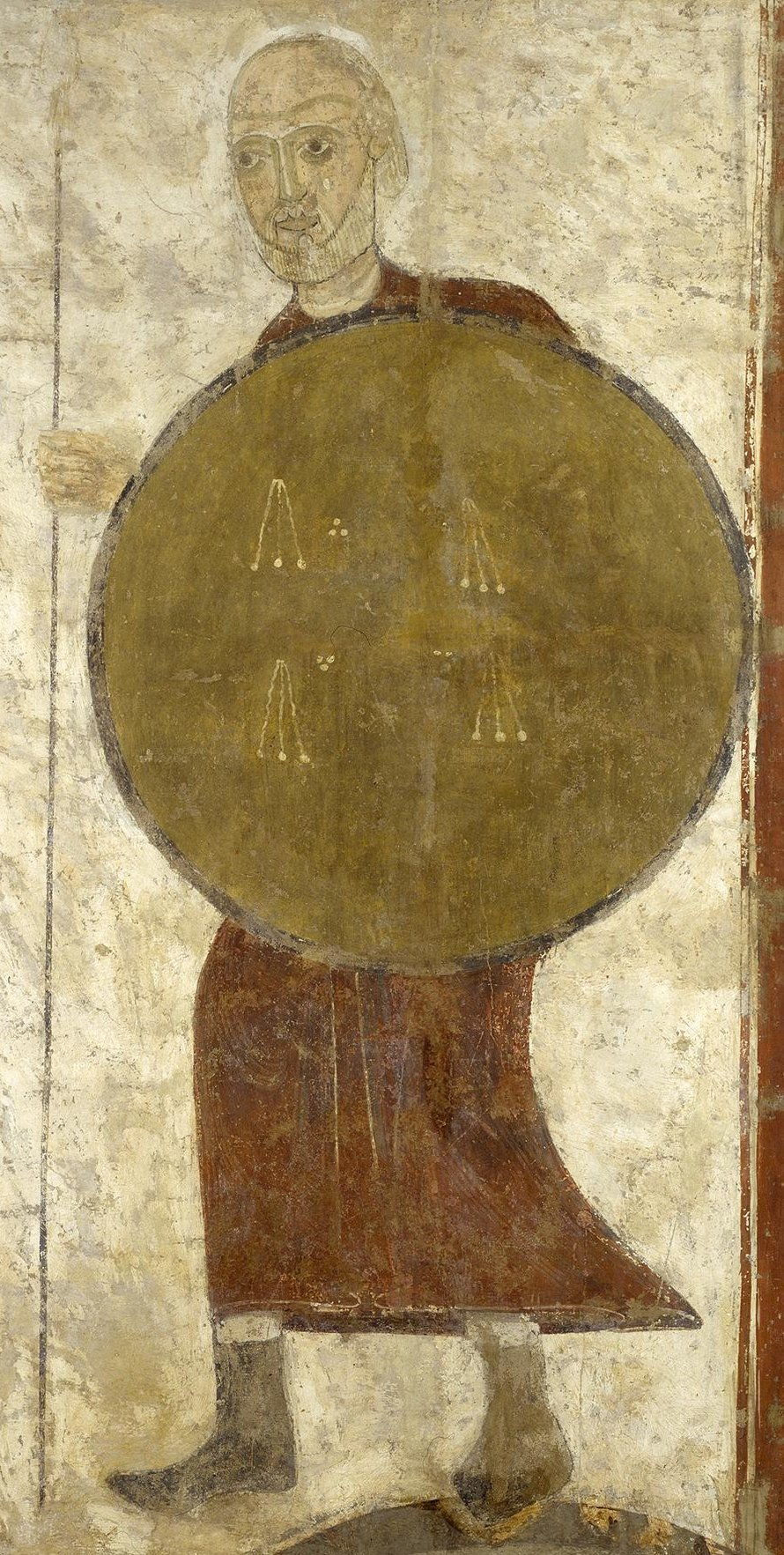
The Warrior of San Baudelio. Remain inside the hermitage.

The Last Supper fills the rest of the north wall. Jesus is seated behind a table with a white cloth in the center of the composition. Many of the disciples are depicted holding knives and raising their hands as if to ask "is it me Lord?" when Jesus says "One of you will betray me." We see St. John at Jesus's bosom and Judas in the front of the composition. The food they are eating seem to be loaves and fish with Judas touching the fish in a bowl. As is customary, St. Peter is featured with a white beard and balding. St. Paul is also portrayed with white hair and a pointed beard, even though he was not one of the original disciples.

The Crucifixion itself appears to be missing from the walls of San Baudelio so it may have eroded with time. Logically it should follow after The Last Supper. It may well be that the Crucifixion was on the east wall near the Roman soldiers, since the Bible does mention them near the cross at the time of the crucifixion.

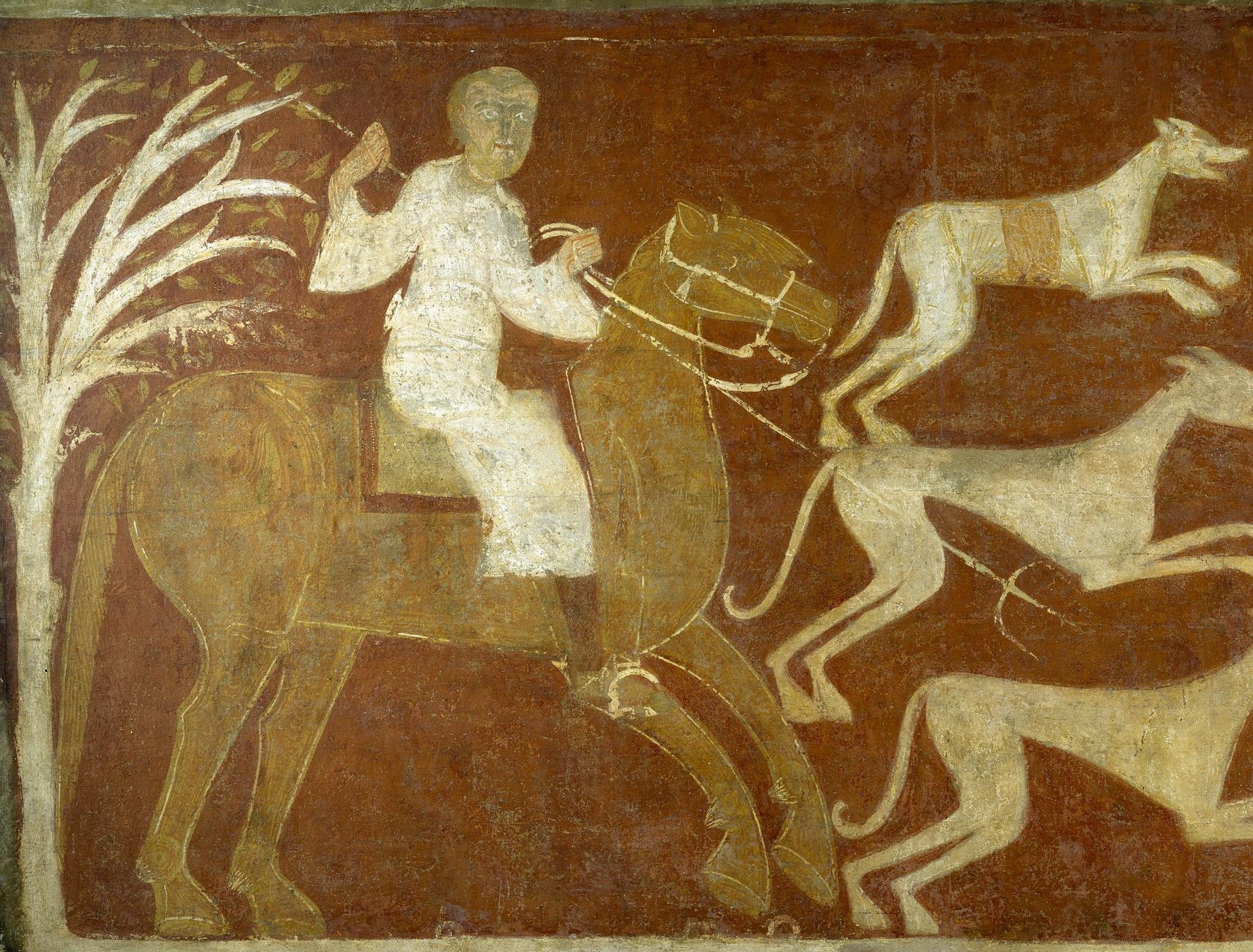
A Horseman Hunting. Remain inside the hermitage.

The next surviving scene depicts the visit by the women to the tomb of Jesus early on Sunday. Originally this scene was on the left side of the south wall of the nave but was removed and currently is in the Boston Museum of Fine Arts. An angel with a green halo seems to be standing in front of the tomb itself so we do not see the stone rolled away as described in the bible. The guards stand, frightened, with bent knees, one covering his face as if to shield himself from the blinding light of the angel. At the very right of the composition, the three women approach wearing halos and holding large vases with ointment. An Angel is depicted wearing an orange headdress with a greenish mantle, as the three Maries approach from the right.

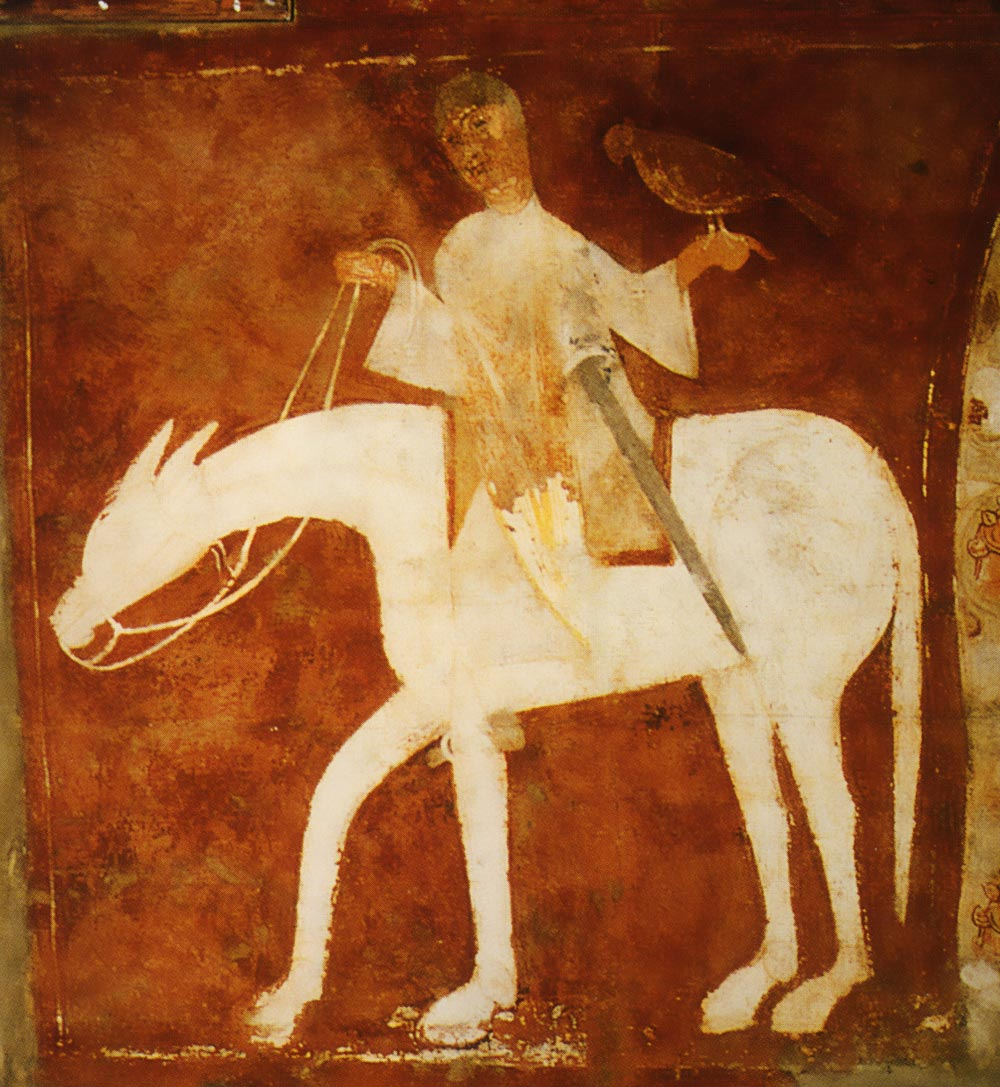
A Falconer. Remain inside the hermitage.

It seems originally that all four walls of the nave had eight large compositions, containing the life and passion of the Christ. It is highly possible at least four scenes may have included the Journey to Emmaus, Doubting Thomas, the Descent of the Holy Spirit on the side walls of the apse. Ideally the series would have concluded with the image of the enthroned Savior of the Last Judgment. It would have probably been similar to the apse of Saint Martin de Fenouillar with the Savior surrounded by the twelve evangelists (including Paul) and the twenty-four elders of Revelation.

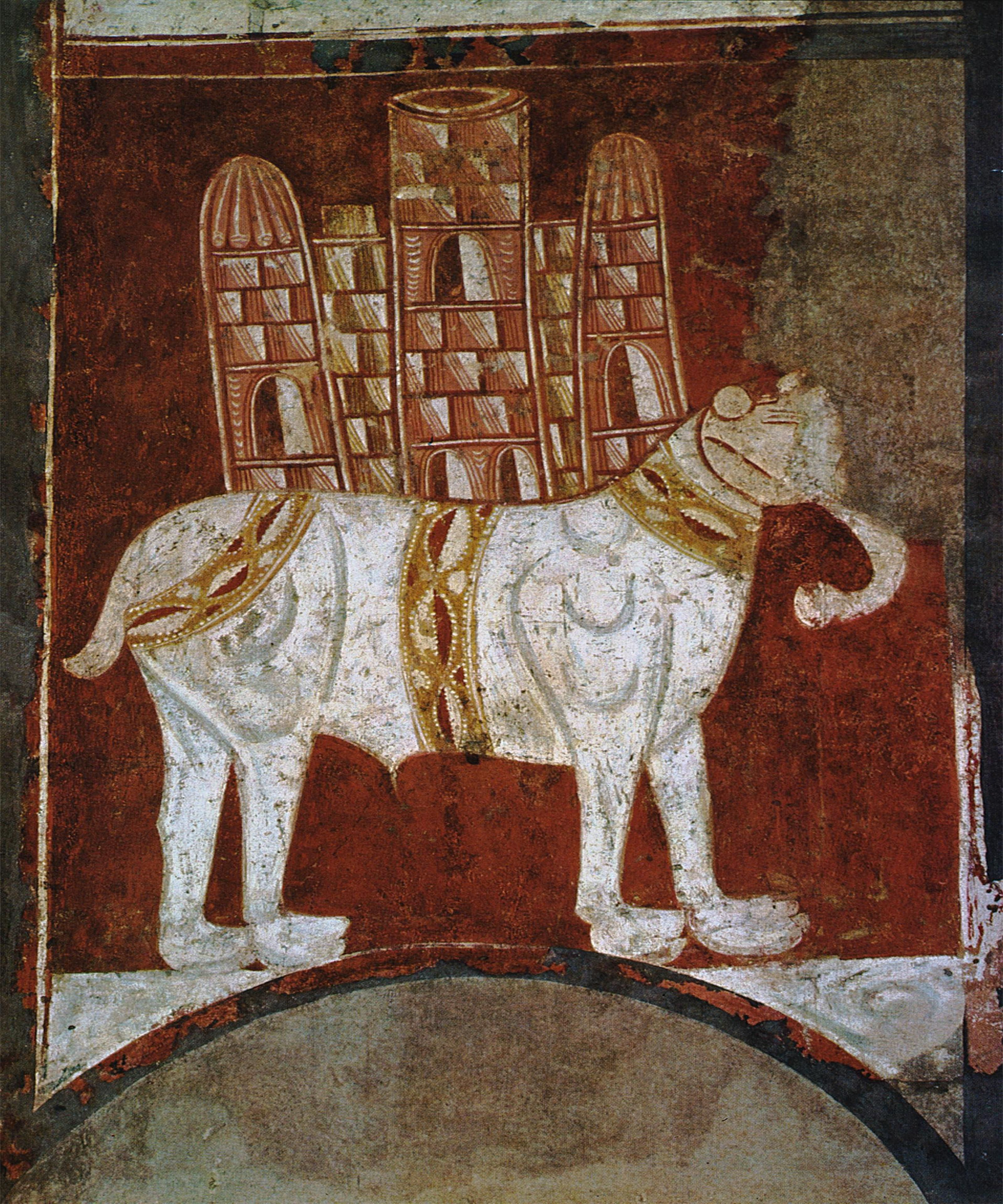
Elephant carrying a castle. Now in Museo del Prado.

==== Secular Frescoes ====
On the lower west wall of the Church is the scene of a wounded deer as it flees the hunter aiming at him with the loaded crossbow. The hunting of this animal is a subject very much in conformity with the iconography from ancient times and the Middle Ages. For the Romans, the deer had a symbolic character of abstaining of the evil of the world. In Christian culture, this icon represents the soul. The deer is also associated with Christ triumphing over the dragon, making it the metaphorical claim a hunt for souls.

Next to the wounded deer on the right is a hunter riding a horse, helped by three dogs chasing hares, which end up trapped in the forest. The hare is a symbol in Christian iconography of the fragility of the soul and strong sexual desire or lust, which must be harassed and overcome.

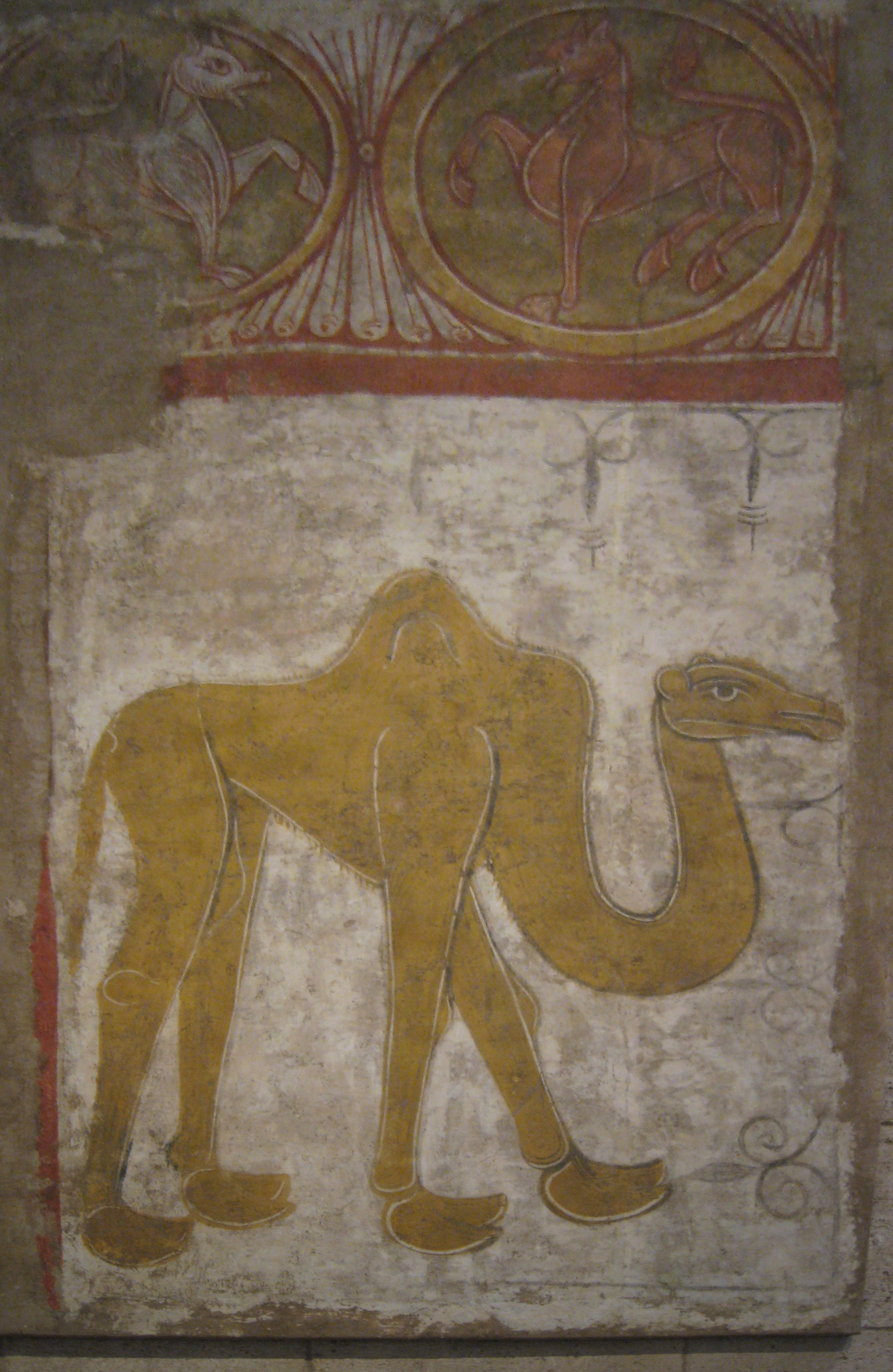
Camel, now in The Cloisters, New York

Continuing to the right on the north wall is a Falconer. Falconry was considered, both in Islam and the Christian Middle Ages as one of the noblest of hunting. The falconer, exhibiting his noble raptor, stands in a victorious posture like a knight triumphing, with the help of faith (the Falcon), over corrupt and evil animals like hares.

Located on the north tribune of the Church, is what looks to be a warrior carrying a spear and a shield. To the right of the warrior is what looks like an elephant. The symbol of humility, the elephant is associated with the figure of Christ, who became the smallest and most obedient of humans to prevent his own death. The elephant of San Baudelio carries on its back a castle, allegory of diseases and miseries that have to be borne in the course of earthly life and the weight of the sins of existence. Next to the elephant is a bear. The bear is sometimes associated with the sin of gluttony and the unknown of the caves he inhabits. Perhaps the warrior who shares the stage with him, can vanquish him.

Behind the warrior on the opposite side of the tribune a camel is depicted, an exotic animal, well known in the ancient world for their roles in the war, transport and the circus. The camel is associated with Early Christian art along with the Magi and other biblical stories. Judging by this camel's deformations, the artist of San Baudelio did not know what a camel looked like. To the left of the camel, vegetation appears as ornaments as well as textile patterns. They are arranged in circles, organized in rows, starting with the smaller ones. On the wall near the central pillar are two greyhounds. On the east wall at the start of the staircase there is a two faced bovine.

There is debate as to the origin of the paintings.

It is believed that the frescos were painted at the same time by two different painters. An older painter and a younger painter. The apse painted by the Master of Baudelio would have been painted first, after the entire mural scheme had been decided. Assembling the pictorial program required painters to collect images into sections within the church structure and into registers along the wall. Although at San Baudelio the registers were painted at the same time, certainly the lower zone would have been painted first. Perhaps living under the Muslim regime longer, accounts for the Moorish influence on the older painter's use of Islamic themes. The younger painter might have been more versed in the Romanesque Christian iconography, possibly, because San Baudelio was in the wilderness between the Christian and Muslim border. Also, those of San Baudelio is similar to the fresco found in the found in The Church of The Vera Cruz De Maderuelo (Segovia).

== See also ==
- The Fuentidueña Apse
- Spanish confiscation
