= Entry of Christ into Jerusalem (van Dyck) =

Painting by Anthony van Dyck

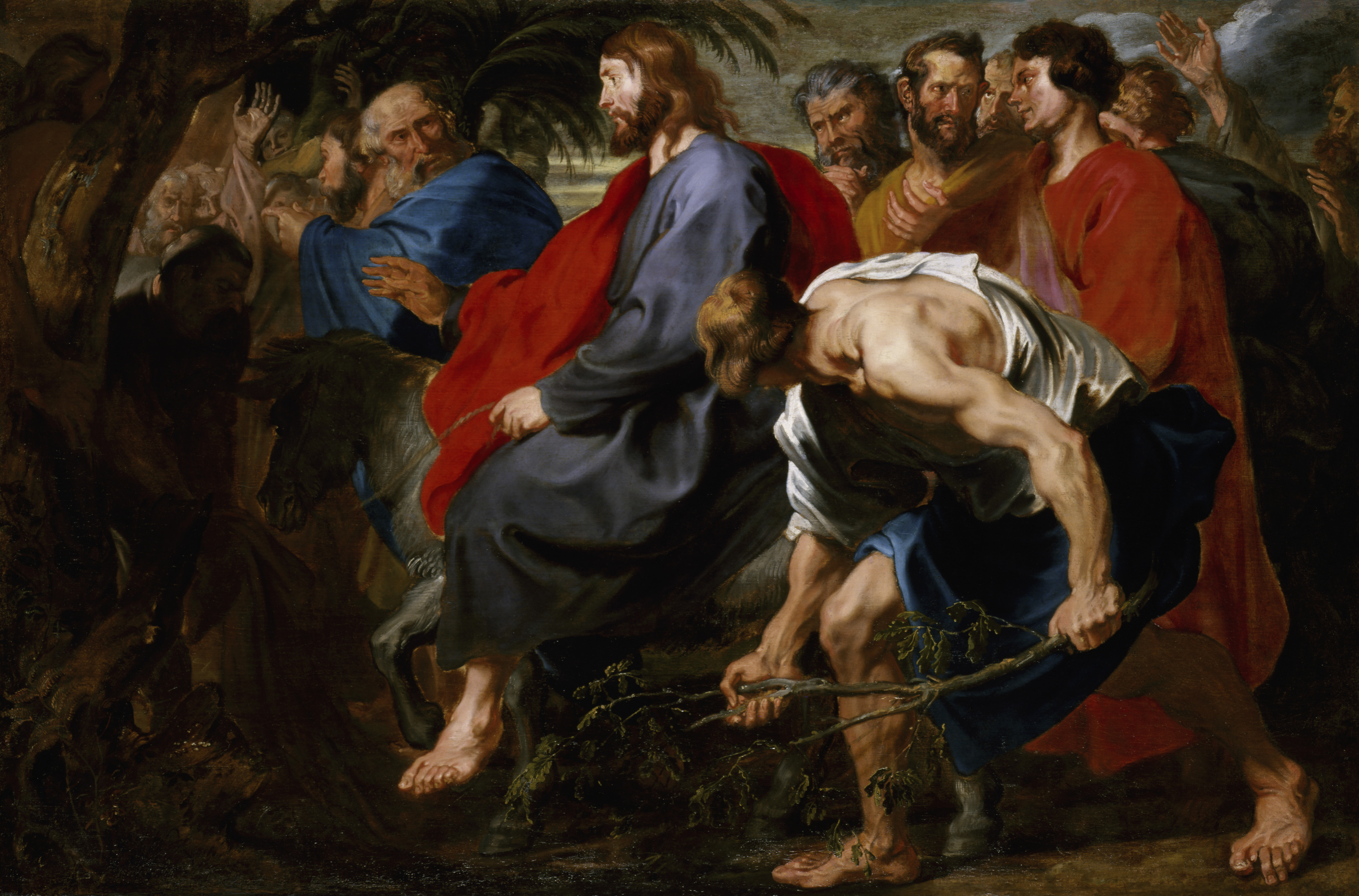
- Artist: Anthony van Dyck
- Year: 1617
- Type: Oil painting on canvas
- Dimensions: 151 cm × 229.2 cm (59.5 in × 90.25 in)
- Location: Indianapolis Museum of Art, Indianapolis

Entry of Christ into Jerusalem is a 1617 oil painting by the Flemish artist Anthony van Dyck, located in the Indianapolis Museum of Art in Indianapolis, Indiana. It depicts Jesus entering Jerusalem as described in the Gospels, the event celebrated on Palm Sunday.

== Description ==
Van Dyck's presents Jesus' entry into Jerusalem. The ass foal Jesus rides is almost entirely enveloped by his robes of rich blue and crimson. Jesus is surrounded by his disciples on foot, and jubilantly welcomed by a crowd of locals who lay branches in his path.

== Historical information ==
Painted when van Dyck was only about 18, Entry of Christ into Jerusalem demonstrates his early mastery of the medium. He was already Peter Paul Rubens' principal assistant. While already working on developing his own, more robust style, van Dyck was heavily influenced by Rubens, as can be seen in the vibrant colors, dynamic composition, and grand scale.

=== Exhibition history ===
From November 2012 to March 2013, this painting was on display at the Prado as part of an exhibit called "The Young van Dyck". Covering his output from ages 16 to 22, this exhibit collected some 90 artworks from when he resided in Antwerp. This tally included 30 large, ambitious artworks like Entry of Christ into Jerusalem. This particular work, though, was noted as one of his most experimental, as the young artist sought to heighten the visual impact of his works.

=== Acquisition ===
Entry of Christ into Jerusalem was purchased by Mr. and Mrs. Herman C. Krannert in 1958 as a gift for the Herron School of Art, which later evolved, in part, into the IMA. It is now in the William C. Griffith Jr. and Carolyn C. Griffith Gallery and has the accession number 58.3.

== See also ==
- List of paintings by Anthony van Dyck
- Triumphal entry into Jerusalem
- Christ's Entry into Jerusalem (Haydon)
- Entry of Christ into Jerusalem (Master of Taüll)
