= Christ's Entry into Jerusalem (Haydon) =

Painting by Benjamin Haydon

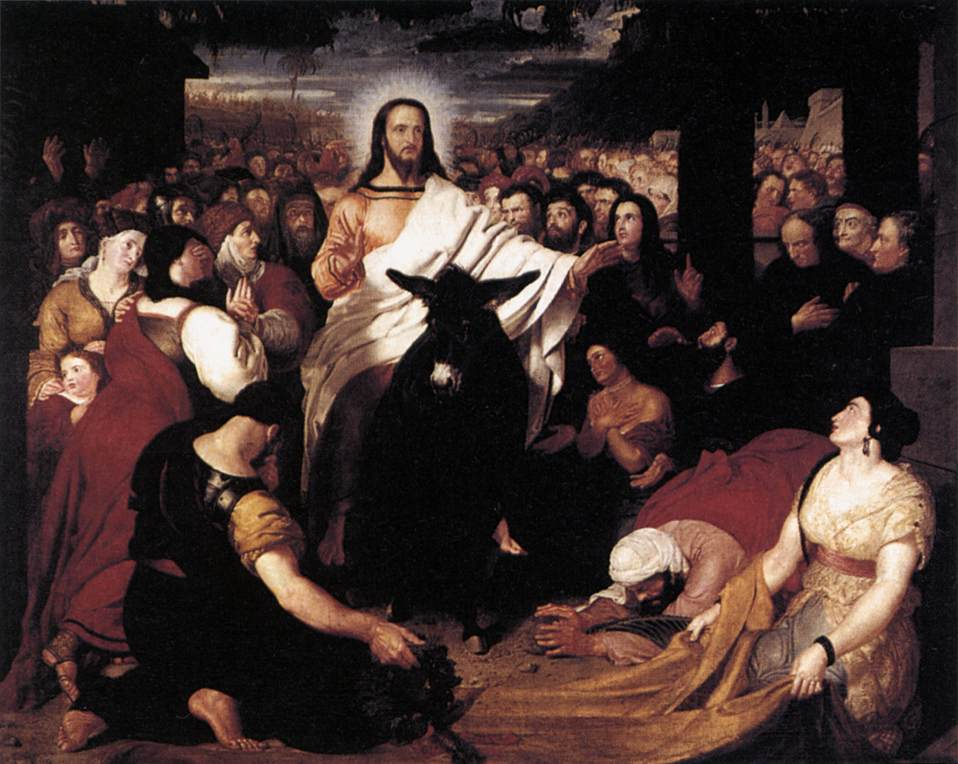
- Artist: Benjamin Robert Haydon
- Year: 1828
- Medium: Oil on canvas
- Subject: Triumphal entry into Jerusalem
- Dimensions: 396 cm × 457 cm (156 in × 180 in)
- Location: Athenaeum of Ohio, Cincinnati

Christ's Entry into Jerusalem is an oil painting by English painter Benjamin Robert Haydon, from 1828. It is located in the Athenaeum of Ohio which is in Cincinnati, Ohio, United States. It depicts Jesus entering Jerusalem as described in the Gospels, the event celebrated on Palm Sunday. The painting features William Wordsworth, William Hazlitt and John Keats along with Isaac Newton and Voltaire, as faces in the crowd looking upon Jesus.

== Description ==
The painting depicts the entry of Jesus into Jerusalem on Palm Sunday on a massive scale typical of both Haydon's work and wider Regency era English paintings of the Romantic art school.

== History ==
=== Creation ===
Following the 1814 completion and exhibition of his rendition of the Judgement of Solomon, Haydon began working on another grandiose biblical subject, Christ's entry into Jerusalem before his crucifixion. By December 1817, Haydon had completed enough of the work to unveil it at his home to an audience of guests including William Wordsworth and John Keats, who were also meeting each other for the first time. Twenty years later, Haydon described the supper as "indeed an immortal evening."

=== Exhibition ===
In March 1820, Haydon began advertising the commercial premiere of the work to be hosted at Egyptian Hall, after failing to find a commission for the painting. This exhibition was Haydon's first major endeavor as a commercial artist, and he borrowed the approach of street painters in nearby Leicester Square by selling programs with a key to understand the important portions of the work. However, wanting to preserve the upper-class nature of his work, Haydon first sent invitations to the members of the Royal Academy of Arts. This self-promotion caused Haydon to become the subject of mockery in the English art world, laughed at in caricatures in the newspapers of London. The biblical painting was also upstaged by the premiere of The Raft of the Medusa by Théodore Géricault, which was being shown next door to Haydon's work at the same time. Despite positive reviews, the painting failed to be purchased and Haydon re-entered it in the annual exhibition of the Royal Society of British Artists.

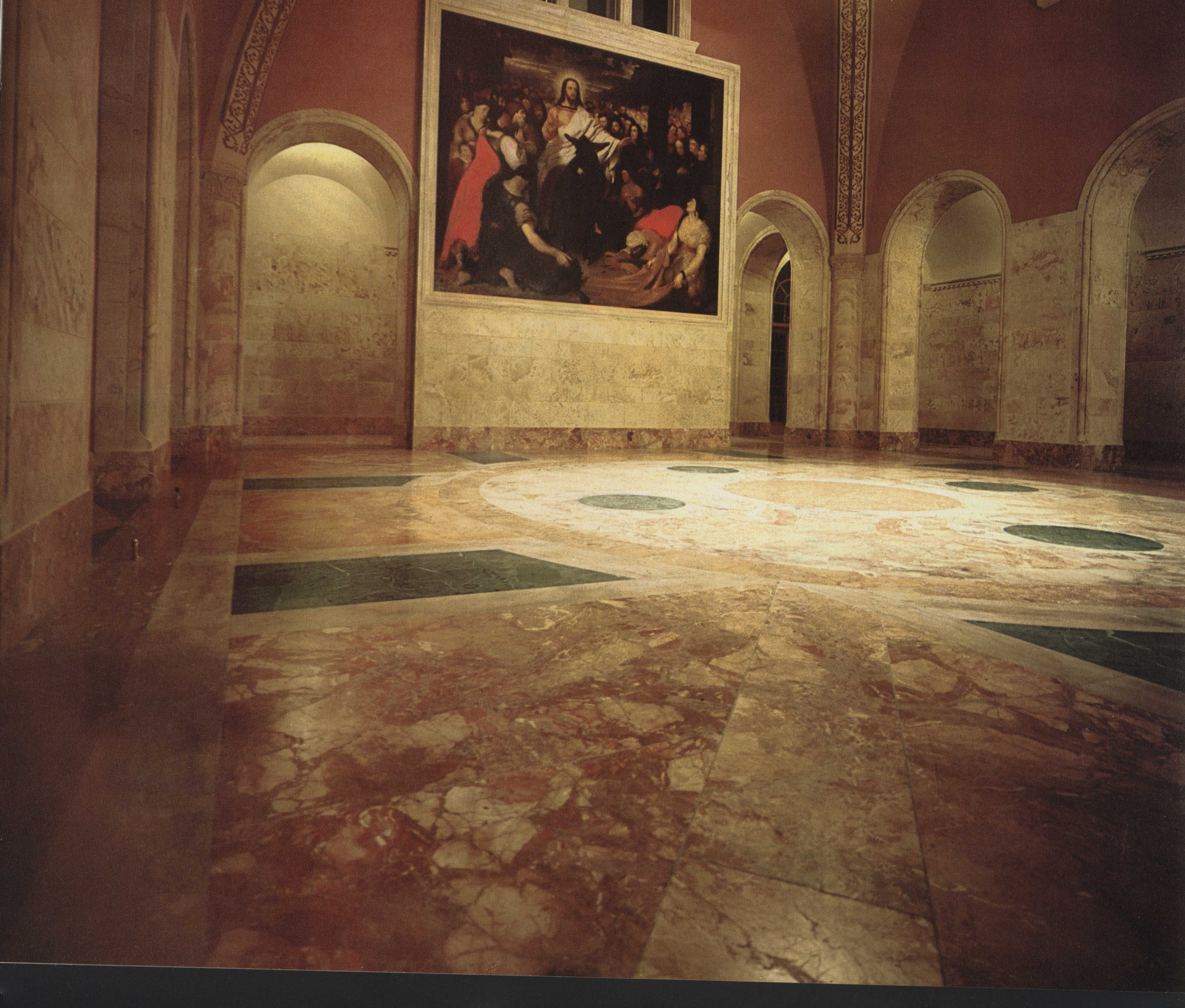
Christ's Entry into Jerusalem shortly after being put on display in the atrium of the Athenaeum of Ohio.

=== Sale and move to Athenaeum of Ohio ===
As a result of Haydon's ongoing financial troubles, the painting was sold to the firm of Childs and Inman in Philadelphia in 1831. For a time it formed the nucleus of the American Gallery of Painting, erected by his cousin John Haviland of Philadelphia. After being cut from its frame and dragged "like a wet blanket" from the building it was displayed in to save the painting from a fire in 1846, the painting came into the possession of Archbishop James Wood. Wood, in turn, gave it to bishop John Baptist Purcell of Cincinnati. It hung in the Cathedral Basilica of St. Peter in Chains and then was sent to the seminary of the Archdiocese of Cincinnati, Mt. St. Mary's of the West in 1929. It received a restoration by personnel of the Cincinnati Art Museum in 1941. In 1961, it was installed in the atrium of Saint Gregory Seminary, and remained there after Mt. St. Mary transferred its operations there. Also exhibited in the atrium is the only work of Juan de las Roelas in the western hemisphere, his rendition of the Liberation of St. Peter.

== See also ==
- Triumphal entry into Jerusalem
- Entry of Christ into Jerusalem (Master of Taüll)
- Entry of Christ into Jerusalem (van Dyck)
