= Fuentidueña =

- Municipality
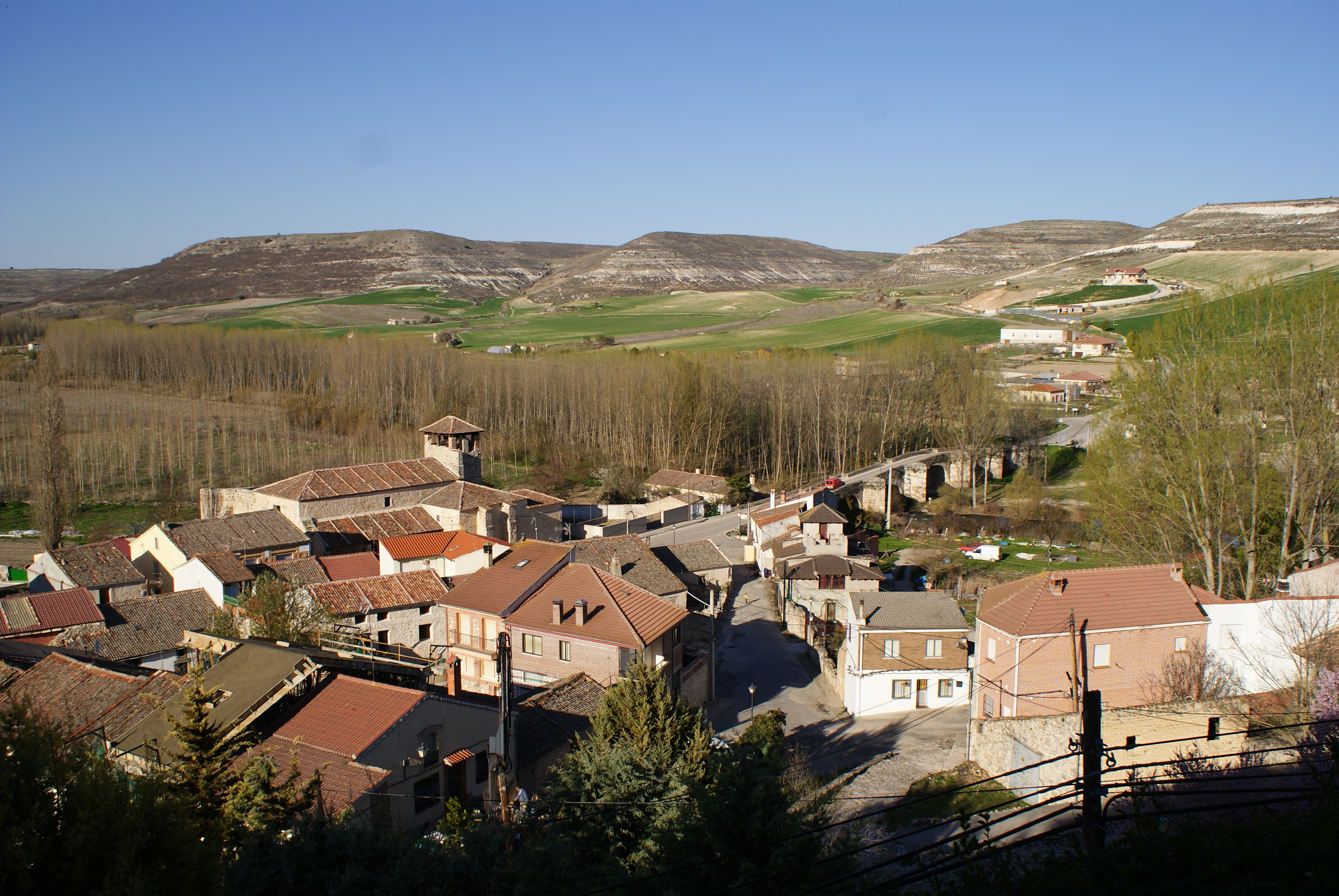
- View on Fuentidueña

- Flag Coat of arms

- Location in Spain. Fuentidueña (Spain)
- Coordinates: 41°26′32″N 3°58′48″W
- Country: Spain
- Autonomous community: Castile and León
- Province: Segovia
- Municipality: Fuentidueña

Area
  - Total: 50 km^{2} (19 sq mi)

Population (2025-01-01)
  - Total: 125
  - Density: 2.5/km^{2} (6.5/sq mi)
- Time zone: UTC+1 (CET)
  - Summer (DST): UTC+2 (CEST)
- Website: Official website

Fuentidueña is a municipality located in the province of Segovia, Castile and León, Spain. According to the 2004 census (INE), the municipality has a population of 158 inhabitants.
