= Entry of Christ into Jerusalem (Master of Taüll) =

1125 painting

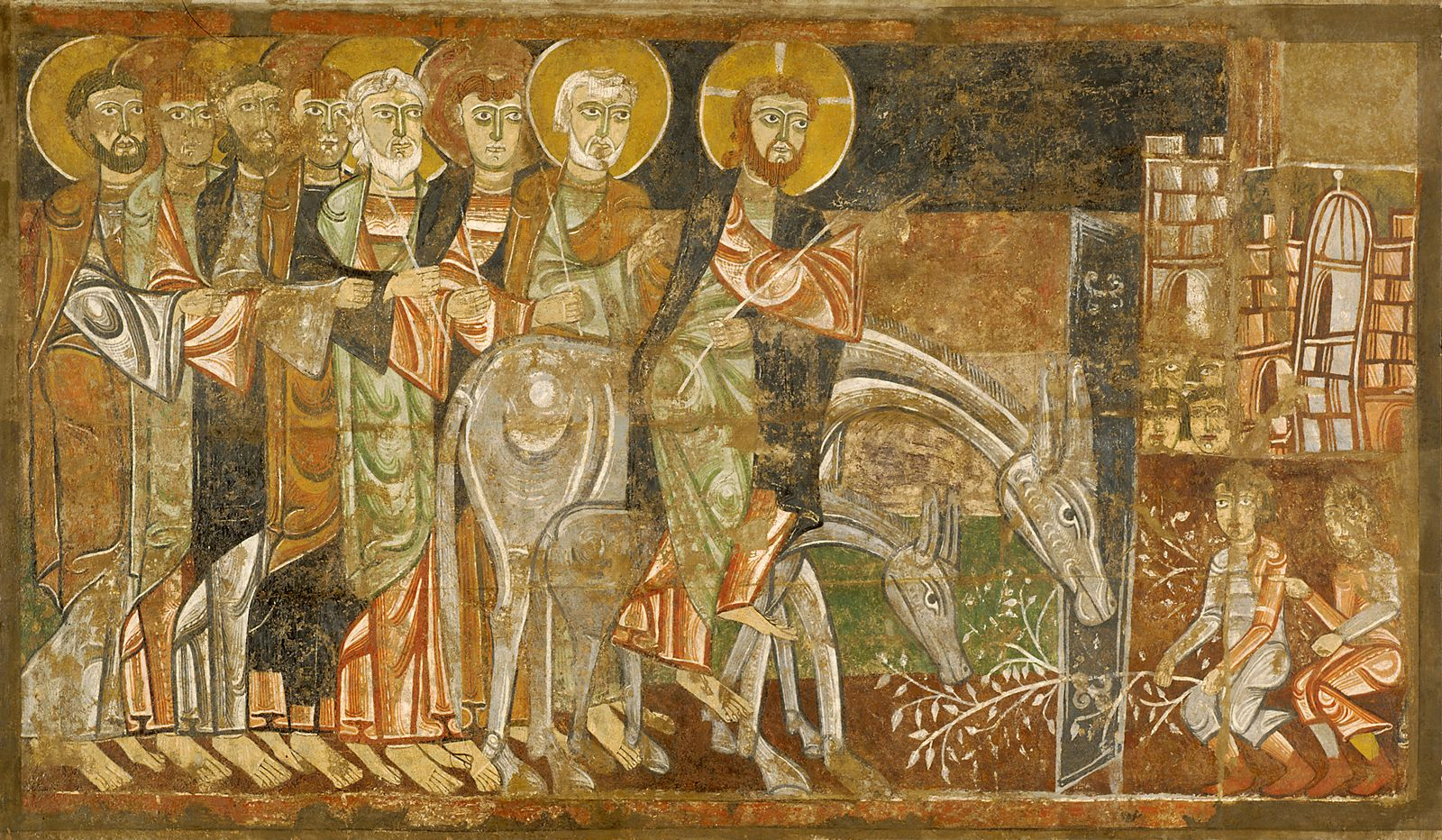
- Year: 1125
- Type: Fresco transferred to canvas
- Dimensions: 179.7 cm × 310 cm (70.75 in × 121 in)
- Location: Indianapolis Museum of Art, Indianapolis

Entry of Christ into Jerusalem is an 1125 fresco by the Master of San Baudelio de Berlanga, originally located at San Baudelio de Berlanga but now on display in the Indianapolis Museum of Art, which is in Indianapolis, Indiana. It depicts Christ and seven disciples entering Jerusalem to the acclaim of its inhabitants.

== Description ==
This fresco is in the Romanesque style popular in northern Spain during the twelfth century. The life-size figures, extending the entire height of the fresco, are marked by curvilinear patterning, schematic drapery folds, and repeated figures creating abstract designs. Jesus, riding an ass and her foal, raises his hands to bless the multitudes come to greet his arrival. These multitudes have been condensed to two kneeling figures spreading branches before him.

== Historical information ==
San Baudelio was constructed in the eleventh century, but the frescoes were not added for another century. There are two distinct cycles: the upper walls were covered in colorful scenes from Christ's life, while the lower walls depicted hunt scenes and exotic animals indicative of the Islamic influence in the region. While the two sets of images have very different subjects, there are many indications that they were created simultaneously, by artists from the same atelier if not the very same artist. The frescoes have a similar quality of line, and the draftsmanship of various human and animal figures seems related. They were also created using the same techniques: initial sketches in buon fresco and fresco-secco, details added in tempera, polished with limewater. Although seemingly at odds, the two sets of frescoes, religious and secular, worked together quite well considering the time and place of their creation. The unstable border between Christian and Muslim regions saw much interpenetration of ideas and people. The Mozarabic people in the region, who practiced Christianity with the trappings of Arab culture, would have been ideally served by San Baudelio's mixture of cultures and iconographies.

=== Location history ===
The remoteness of Berlanga de Duero and inaccessibility of its church helped the frescoes survive for centuries, protecting them from everything but the weather. In 1927, the villagers of Berlanga sold the frescoes that had not been destroyed to an art dealer named Leon Levi. They were then dispersed to museums around the world, including the Boston Museum of Fine Arts, the Metropolitan Museum of Art, the Cincinnati Art Museum, and the Prado Museum.

=== Acquisition ===
The IMA acquired Entry of Christ into Jerusalem in 1957 as a gift of G. H. A. Clowes and Elijah B. Martindale. It was given the accession number 57.151 and hangs in the Irving M. Fauvre Gallery by its sister fresco, Marriage at Cana.

== See also ==
- Sant Climent de Taüll
