= The Crucified Christ (The Cloisters) =

Ivory sculpture now stored at The Cloisters, New York, United States

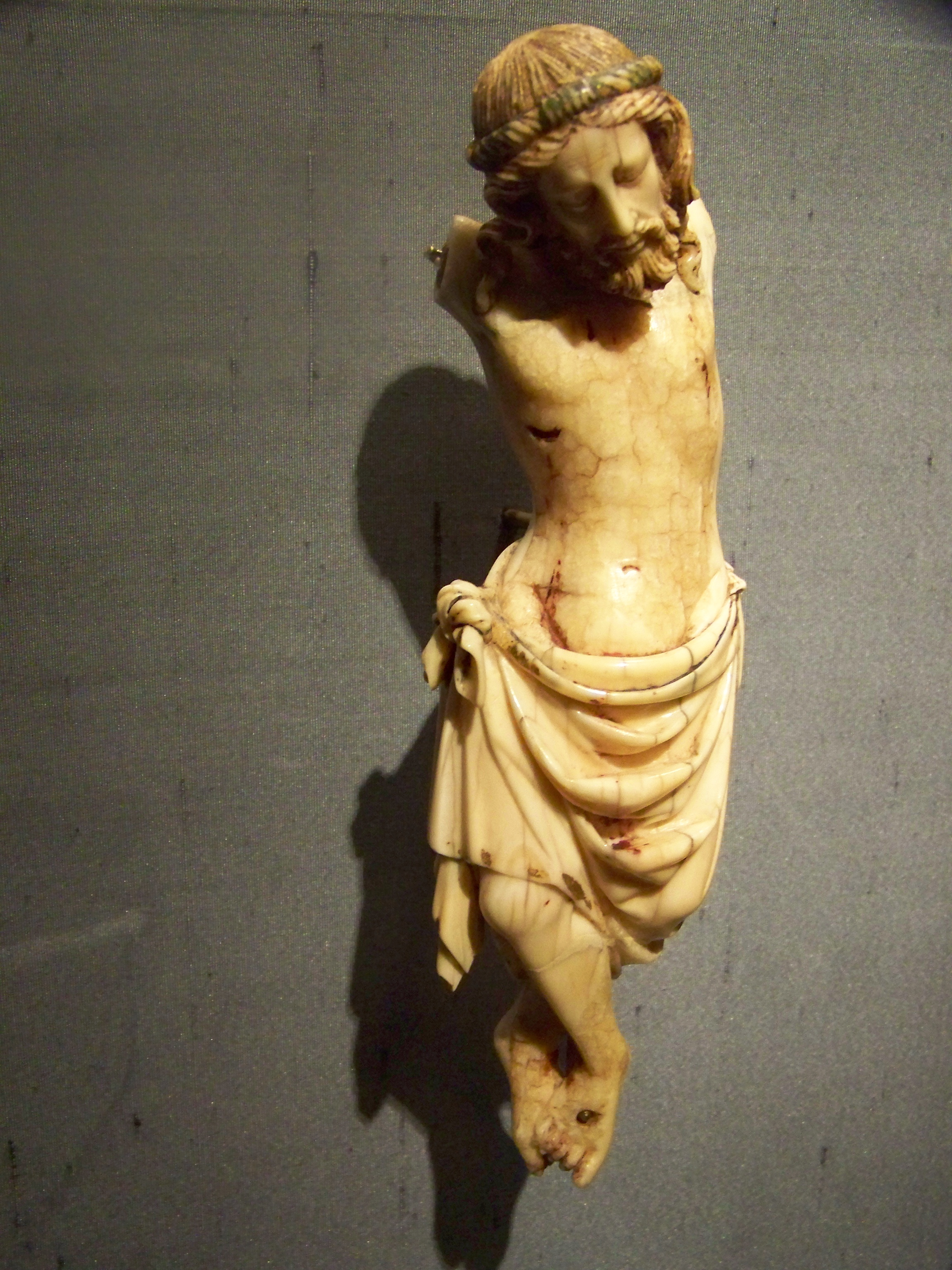
Crucified Christ, 19.2 x 5.3 x 3.5 cm

The Crucified Christ (MA 2005.274) is a sculpture in walrus ivory, likely from Paris around 1300, now housed in The Cloisters, New York.

== Description ==
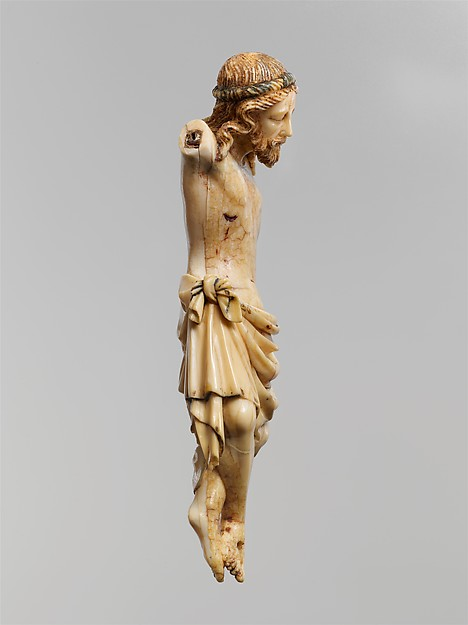
Side view

The sculpture retains traces of paint and gilding. Despite its small scale, it is crafted in a monumental style. It depicts the dead and crucified body of Christ, a representation that, by the 12th century, was widely seen as a symbol of human suffering. The work is noted for its high-quality craftsmanship and the subtle, sensitive rendering of the torso. The stunted legs are a notable and somewhat inexplicable feature.

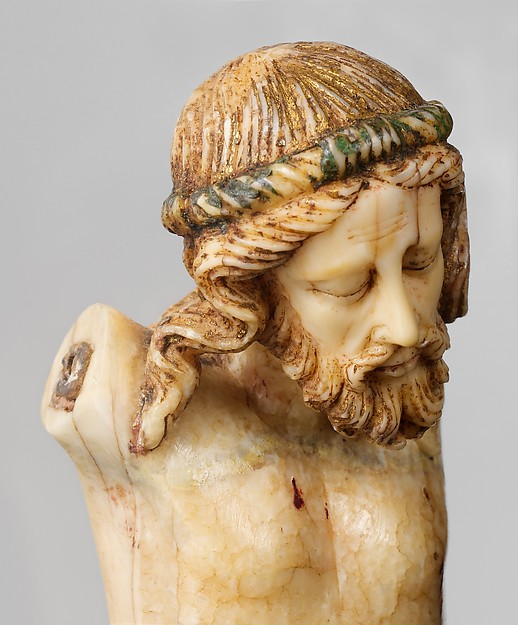
Head of Christ

The sculpture is damaged, with both arms, which would have been made separately, now missing. It is one of the few surviving northern European ivory statuettes of its kind (around 50 are known), which were popular in Paris around 1300, and it is arguably the finest of its kind. The sculpture was likely intended to be hung above an altar as a visible symbol of the sacrifice of the Son of God and a testament to his triumph over death.

It was in a private collection in Argentina from 1964 until its acquisition by the Metropolitan Museum of Art in 2005.

== Bibliography ==
- Barnet, Peter (2006). "Recent Acquisitions: A Selection, 2005–2006. Medieval Europe". The Metropolitan Museum of Art Bulletin. 64 (2). JSTOR 20209242.
- Barnet, Peter; Wu, Nancy (2005). "The Cloisters: Medieval Art and Architecture". New York: Metropolitan Museum of Art (PDF) (1st ed.). New York: The Metropolitan Museum of Art. ISBN 978-1-5883-9176-6.
- Barnet, Peter; Wu, Nancy (2012). The Cloisters: Medieval Art and Architecture (75th Anniv., rev. and expanded ed.). New York: The Metropolitan Museum of Art. p. 82. ISBN 978-1-58839-477-4.
- Williamson, Paul; Davies, Glyn (2014). Medieval Ivory Carvings, 1200–1550. Vol. 1. London: Victoria and Albert Museum. p. 91. ISBN 978-1-85177-612-2.
