= Pulpit =

Speaker's stand in a church

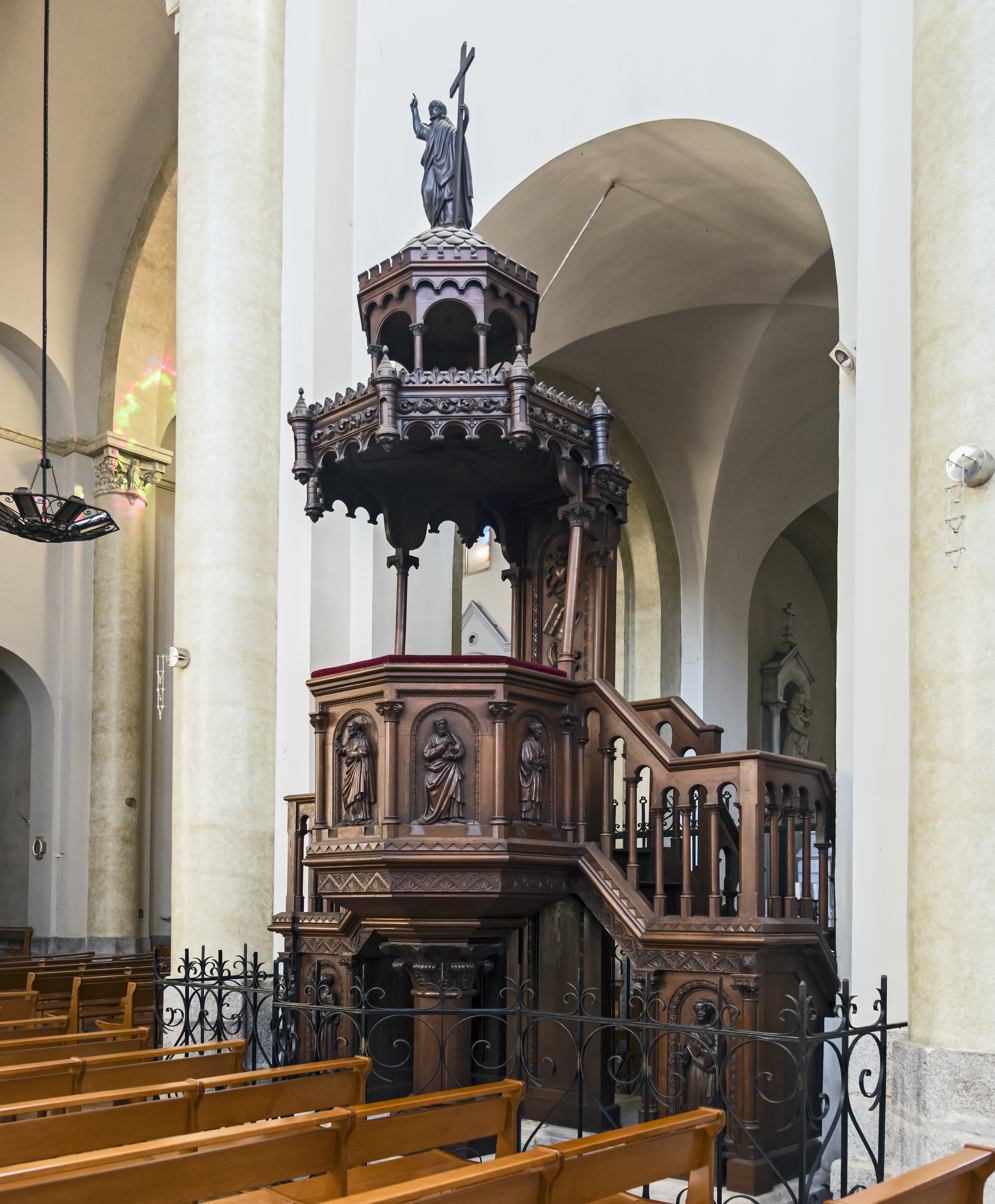
The pulpit of the Notre-Dame de Revel in Revel, Haute-Garonne, France

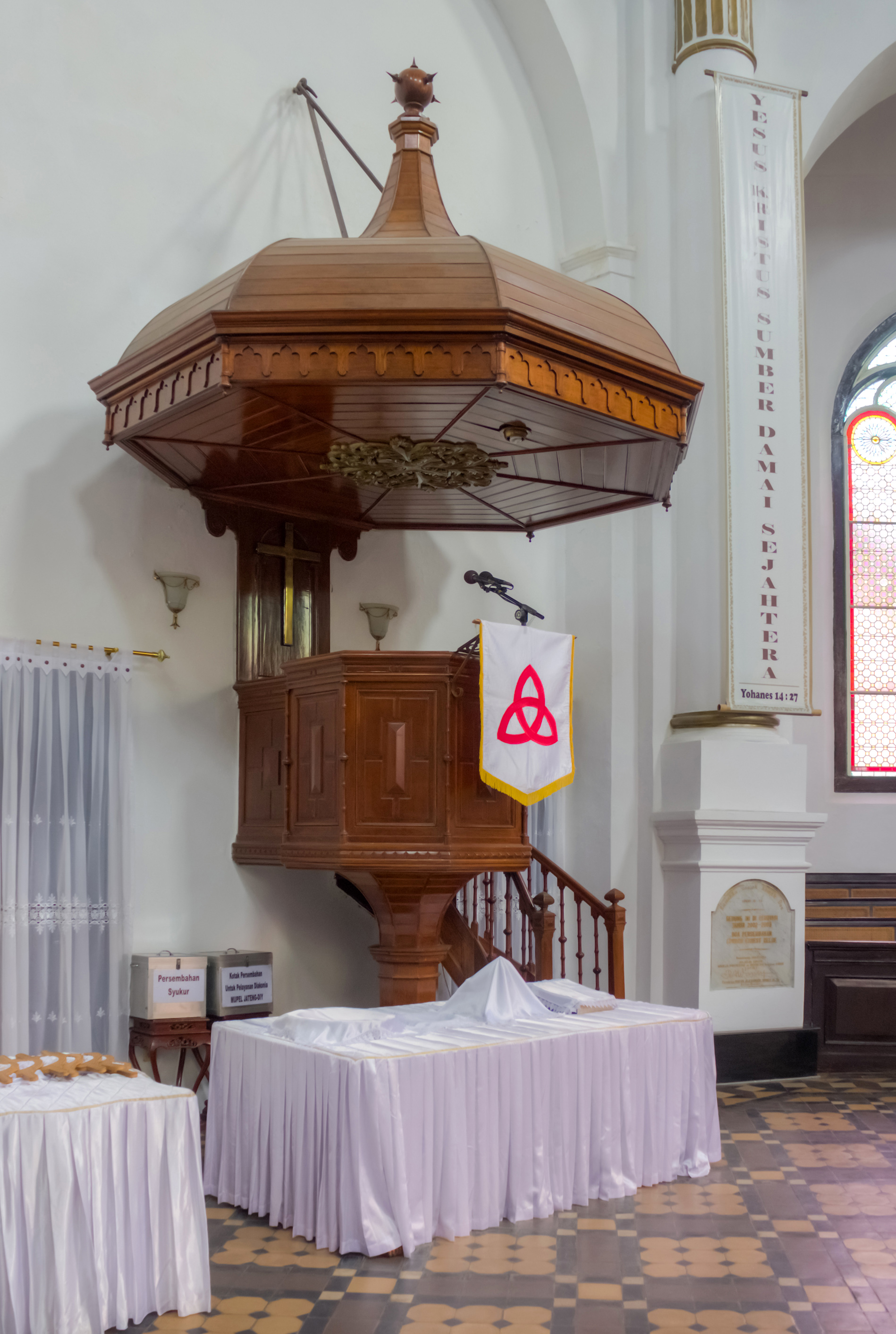
Pulpit at Blenduk Church in Semarang, Indonesia, with large sounding board and cloth antependium

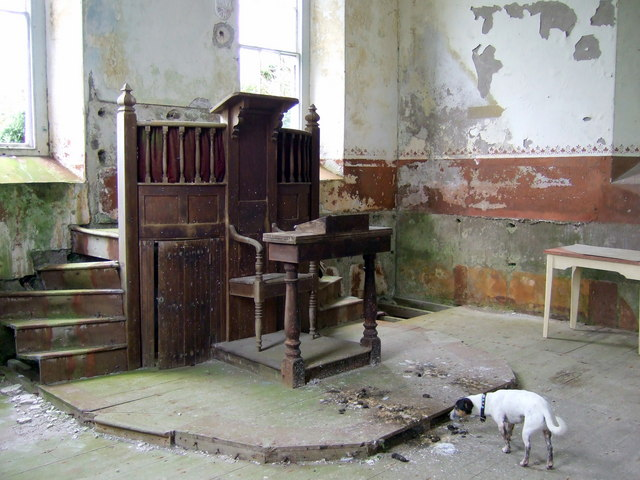
"Two-decker" pulpit in an abandoned Welsh chapel, with reading desk below

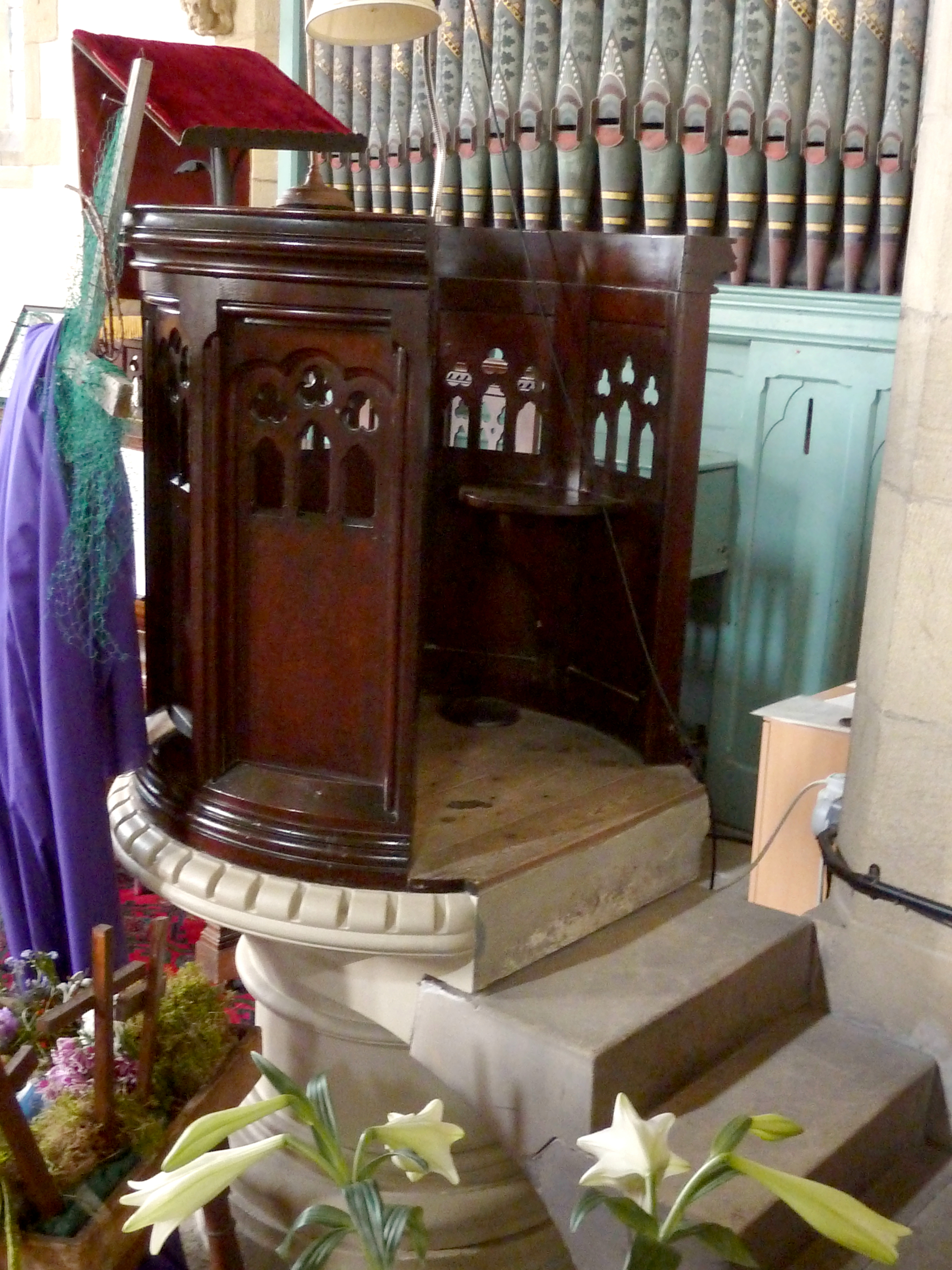
1870 Gothic Revival oak pulpit, Church of St Thomas, Thurstonland

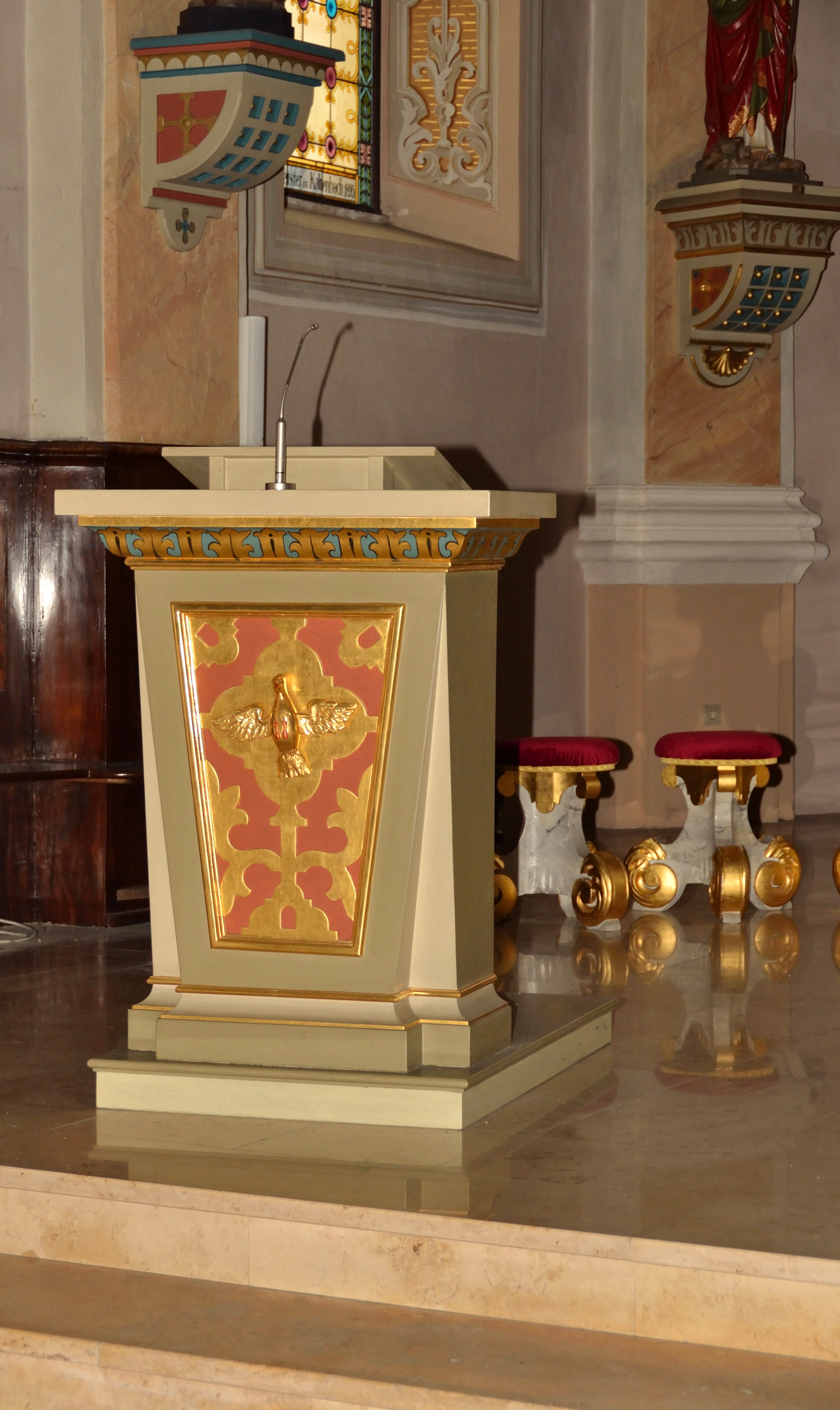
Ambo, in the modern Catholic sense, in Austria

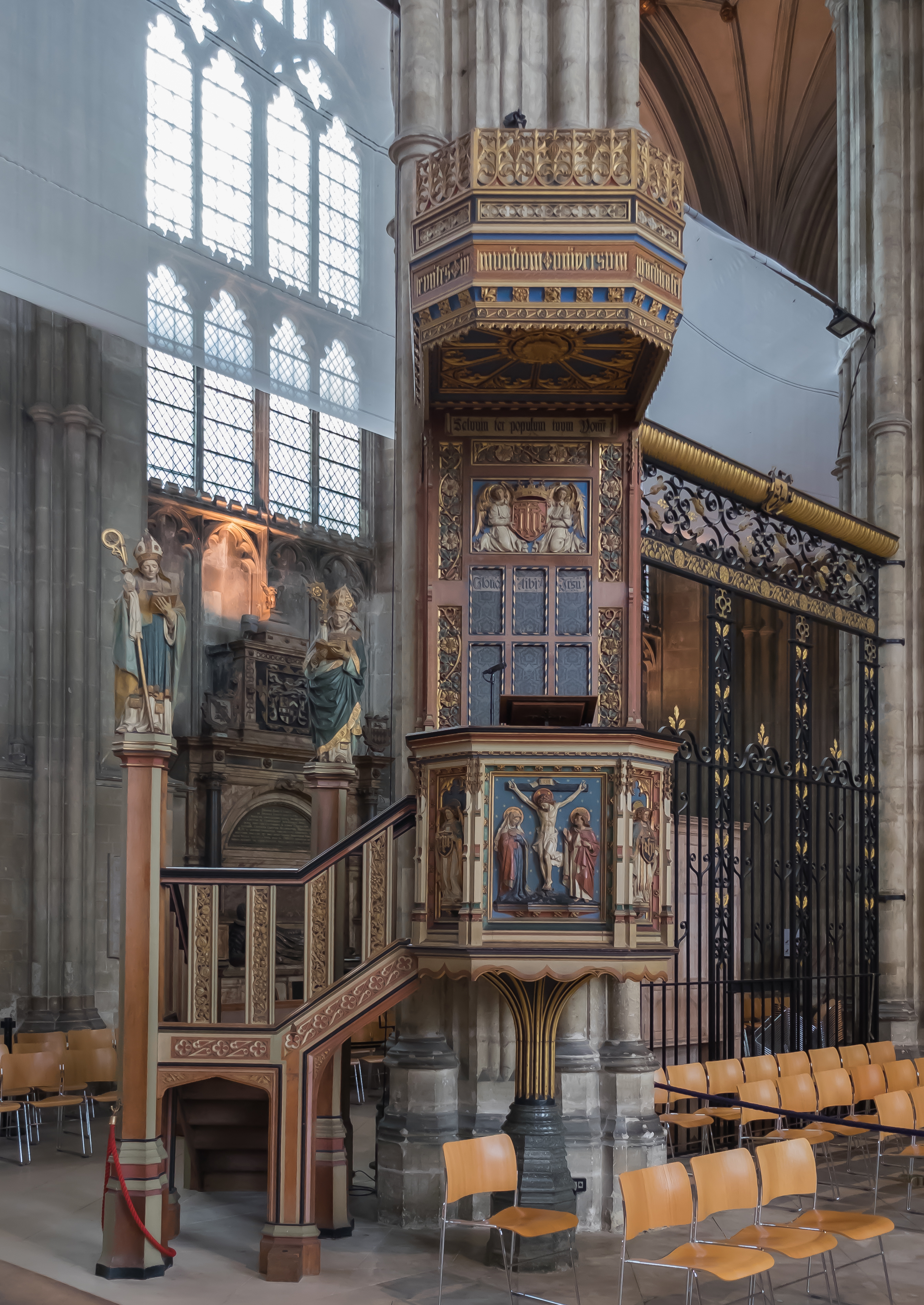
19th-century wooden pulpit in Canterbury Cathedral

A pulpit is an elevated stand for preachers in a Christian church. The origin of the word is the Latin pulpitum (platform or staging). A traditional pulpit is raised well above the surrounding floor for audibility and visibility, accessible by steps, with sides about waist height. From the late medieval period onwards, pulpits have often had a canopy known as the sounding board, tester or abat-voix above and sometimes also behind the speaker, normally in wood. Although sometimes highly decorated, this is not purely decorative, but can have a useful acoustic effect in projecting the preacher's voice to the congregation below, especially before the invention of modern audio equipment. Most pulpits have one or more book-stands on which the preacher can rest his bible, notes or texts.

The pulpit is generally reserved for clergy. This is mandated in the regulations of the Catholic Church and several others (although not always strictly observed). Even in Welsh Nonconformism, this was considered appropriate, and in some chapels a second pulpit was erected opposite the main one for lay exhortations, testimonies and other speeches. Many churches have a second, smaller stand called the lectern located in the Epistle side, which can be used by lay persons, and is often used for other Scripture lessons and regular announcements. The traditional Catholic location of the pulpit to the left side of the chancel or nave has been generally retained by Lutherans and many Anglicans, while in Presbyterian and Baptist churches the pulpit is located in the centre behind the communion table. Many modern Roman Catholic churches have an ambo that functions as both a pulpit and lectern.

Equivalent platforms for speakers are the bema (bima, bimah) of ancient Greece and Jewish synagogues, and the minbar of Islamic mosques. From the pulpit is often used synecdochically for something which is said with official church authority.

== Location ==
In many Reformed and Evangelical Protestant denominations, the pulpit is at the centre of the front of the church, while in the Catholic, Lutheran, and Anglican traditions the pulpit is placed to one side and the altar or communion table is in the centre. In many Christian churches, there are two speakers' stands at the front of the church. Often, the one on the left (as viewed by the congregation) is called the pulpit. Since the Gospel lesson is often read from the pulpit, the pulpit side of the church is sometimes called the gospel side.

In both Catholic and Protestant churches the pulpit may be located closer to the main congregation in the nave, either on the nave side of the crossing, or at the side of the nave some way down. This is especially the case in large churches, to ensure the preacher can be heard by all the congregation. Fixed seating for the congregation came relatively late in the history of church architecture, so the preacher being behind some of the congregation was less of an issue than later. Fixed seating facing forward in the nave and modern electric amplification has tended to reduce the use of pulpits in the middle of the nave. Outdoor pulpits, usually attached to the exterior of the church, or at a preaching cross, are also found in several denominations. If attached to the outside wall of a church, these may be entered from a doorway in the wall, or by steps outside.

The other speaker's stand, usually on the right (as viewed by the congregation), is known as the lectern. The word lectern comes from the Latin word "lectus" past participle of legere, meaning "to read", because the lectern primarily functions as a reading stand. It is typically used by lay people to read the scripture lessons (except for the Gospel lesson), to lead the congregation in prayer, and to make announcements. Because the epistle lesson is usually read from the lectern, the lectern side of the church is sometimes called the epistle side. In other churches, the lectern, from which the Epistle is read, is located to the congregation's left and the pulpit, from which the sermon is delivered, is located on the right (the Gospel being read from either the centre of the chancel or in front of the altar).

Though unusual, movable pulpits with wheels were also found in English churches. They were either wheeled into place for each service where they would be used or, as at the hospital church in Shrewsbury, rotated to different positions in the church quarterly in the year, to allow all parts of the congregation a chance to have the best sound. A portable outside pulpit of wood and canvas was used by John Wesley, and a 19th-century Anglican vicar devised a folding iron pulpit for using outdoors.

== Origins ==
The Ancient Greek bema (βῆμα) means both 'platform' and 'step', and was used for a variety of secular raised speaking platforms in ancient Greece and Rome, and from those times to today for the central raised platform in Jewish synagogues. Modern synagogue bimahs are often similar in form to centrally placed pulpits in Evangelical churches.

The use of a bema carried over from Judaism into early Christian church architecture. It was originally a raised platform, often large, with a lectern and seats for the clergy, from which lessons from the Scriptures were read and the sermon was delivered. In Western Christianity the bema developed over time into the sanctuary and chancel (or presbytery).

The next development was the ambo, from a Greek word meaning an elevation. This was originally a raised platform from which the Epistle and Gospel would be read, and was an option to be used as a preacher's platform for homilies, though there were others. Saint John Chrysostom (died 407) is recorded as preaching from the ambo, but this was probably uncommon at this date. In cathedrals early bishops seem often to have preached from their chair in the apse, echoing the position of magistrates in the secular basilicas whose general form most large early churches adopted. Often there were two ambos, one to each side, one used more as a platform on which the choir sang; sometimes the gospel was read, chanted or sung from one side and the epistle from the other. The location of the ambo within the church varied, with about the same range of places as modern pulpits. In ancient Syrian churches it was often placed in the centre of the nave (on both axes). Gradually the ambo came to resemble the modern pulpit in both form and function, though early examples in large churches are often large enough to accommodate several people. The steps up to the pulpit almost invariably approach it from the side or behind, and are often curved. The typical design of the Islamic minbar, where a straight flight of steps leads to the front of the pulpit, is very different.

The Ambon of Henry II, an Imperial gift of 1014 to Aachen Cathedral, was originally installed centrally, but later moved to the side. It is richly decorated with sheets of gold, ivory, and gems, probably emulating Justinian's lost pulpit of Hagia Sophia in Constantinople, of which a description by Paul the Silentiary survives. In churches where there is only one speaker's stand at the front of the church, it serves the functions of both lectern and pulpit and may be called the ambo, which is still the official Catholic term for the place the gospel is read from.

Large raised pulpits, elaborately carved with relief panels, were important monuments in the Italian Duecento, with the best known including those of the Pisa Baptistery (dated 1260) and Siena Cathedral Pulpit by Nicola Pisano and the Pulpit of Sant' Andrea, Pistoia, by his son Giovanni Pisano (1297–1301).

== Catholicism ==
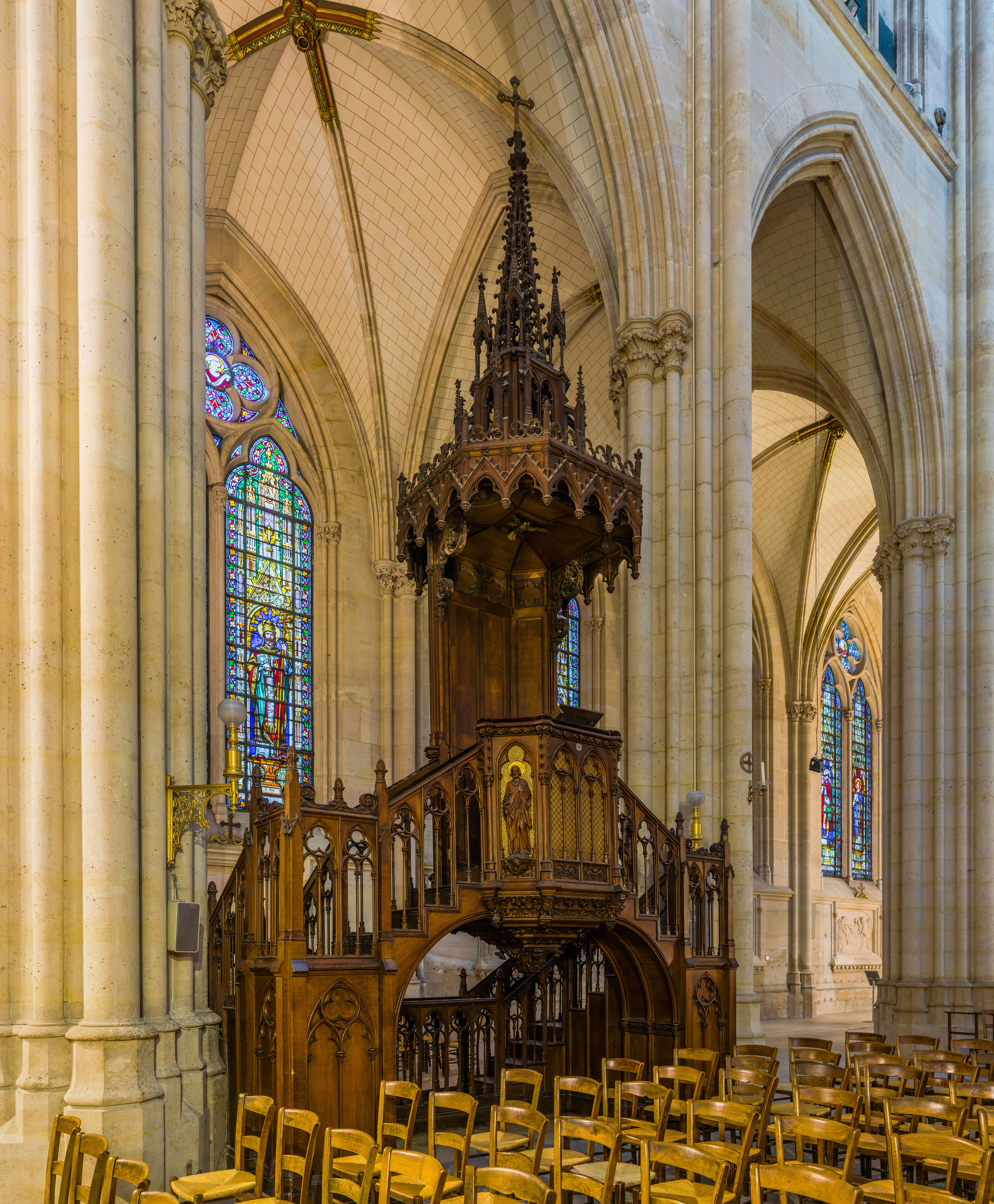
The carved wooden pulpit of the Basilica of Saint Clotilde in Paris, France

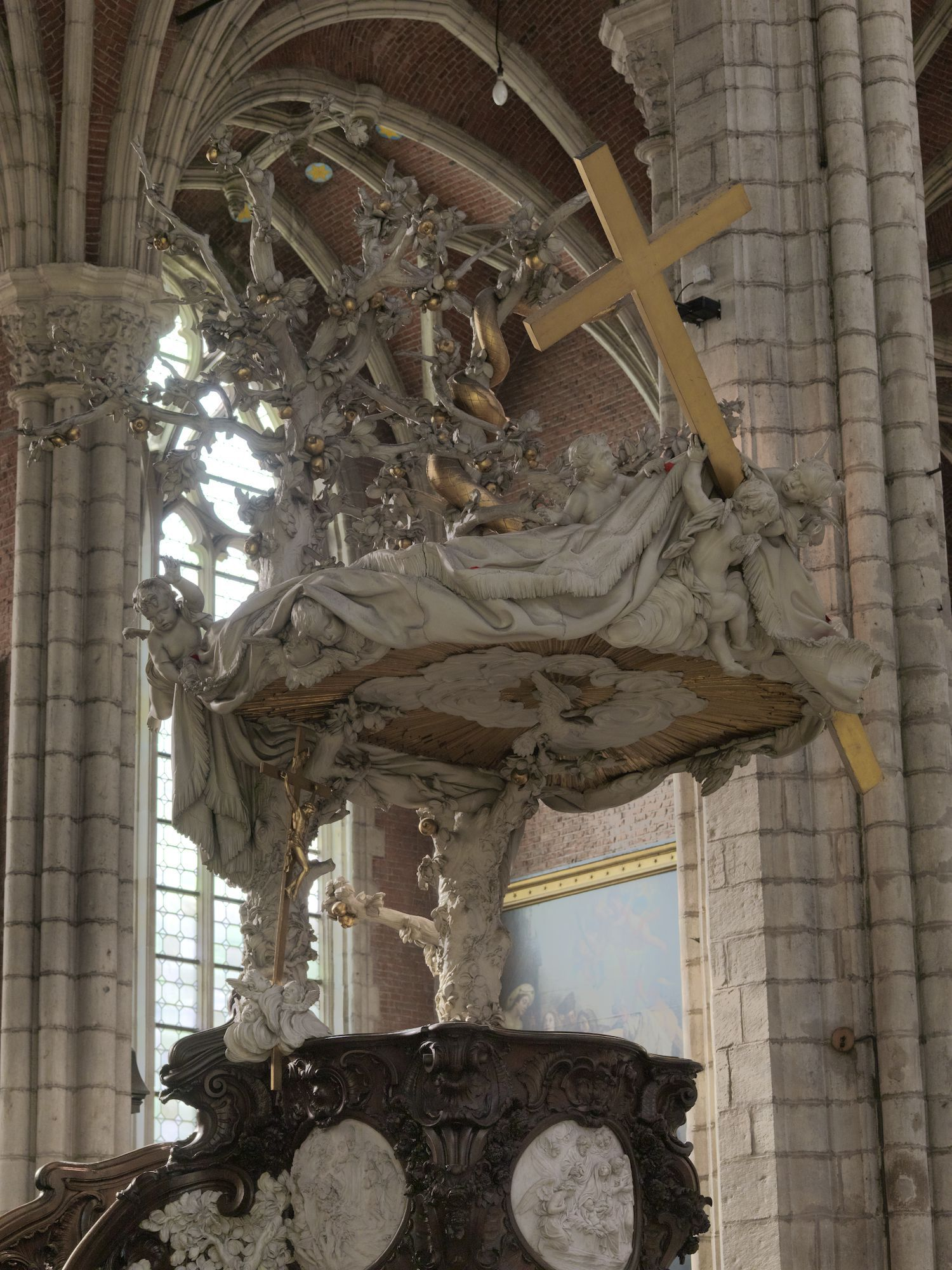
Pulpit of Saint Bavo's Cathedral, Ghent, by Laurent Delvaux

Preaching had always been important in Catholicism, but received a particular revival in the late Middle Ages with the two preaching orders of friars, the Franciscans and Dominicans, the former tending to an emotional and populist style and the latter more intellectual. Some preaching was done outdoors by touring preachers, but the orders, especially in Italy, soon began constructing large churches designed to hold congregations who came to hear star preachers. These featured large raised pulpits, typically some way down the nave, and sometimes in pairs on either side of the nave. These were both used for various purposes, whether different readings in services, accommodating singers or musicians at times, or for disputations between two speakers across the nave. Accordingly, they often have a larger platform area than later pulpits. For example, the St. Antony's Church, Ollur, pulpit is one of the tallest and largest relief sculptured wooden pulpit in India.

In Western Catholic Churches, the stand used for readings and homilies is formally called the ambo. Despite its name, this structure usually more closely resembles a lectern than the ambon of the Eastern Catholic Churches. The readings are typically read from an ambo in the sanctuary, and depending on the arrangement of the church, the homily may be delivered from a raised pulpit where there is one. The General Instruction of the Roman Missal (GIRM) specifies:

309. The dignity of the word of God requires that in the church there be a suitable place from which it may be proclaimed and toward which the attention of the faithful naturally turns during the Liturgy of the Word. It is appropriate that generally this place be a stationary ambo and not simply a movable lectern. The ambo must be located in keeping with the design of each church in such a way that the ordained ministers and readers may be clearly seen and heard by the faithful. From the ambo only the readings, the Responsorial Psalm, and the Easter Proclamation (Exsultet) are to be proclaimed; likewise it may be used for giving the Homily and for announcing the intentions of the Universal Prayer. The dignity of the ambo requires that only a minister of the word should stand at it. ...

== Protestantism ==
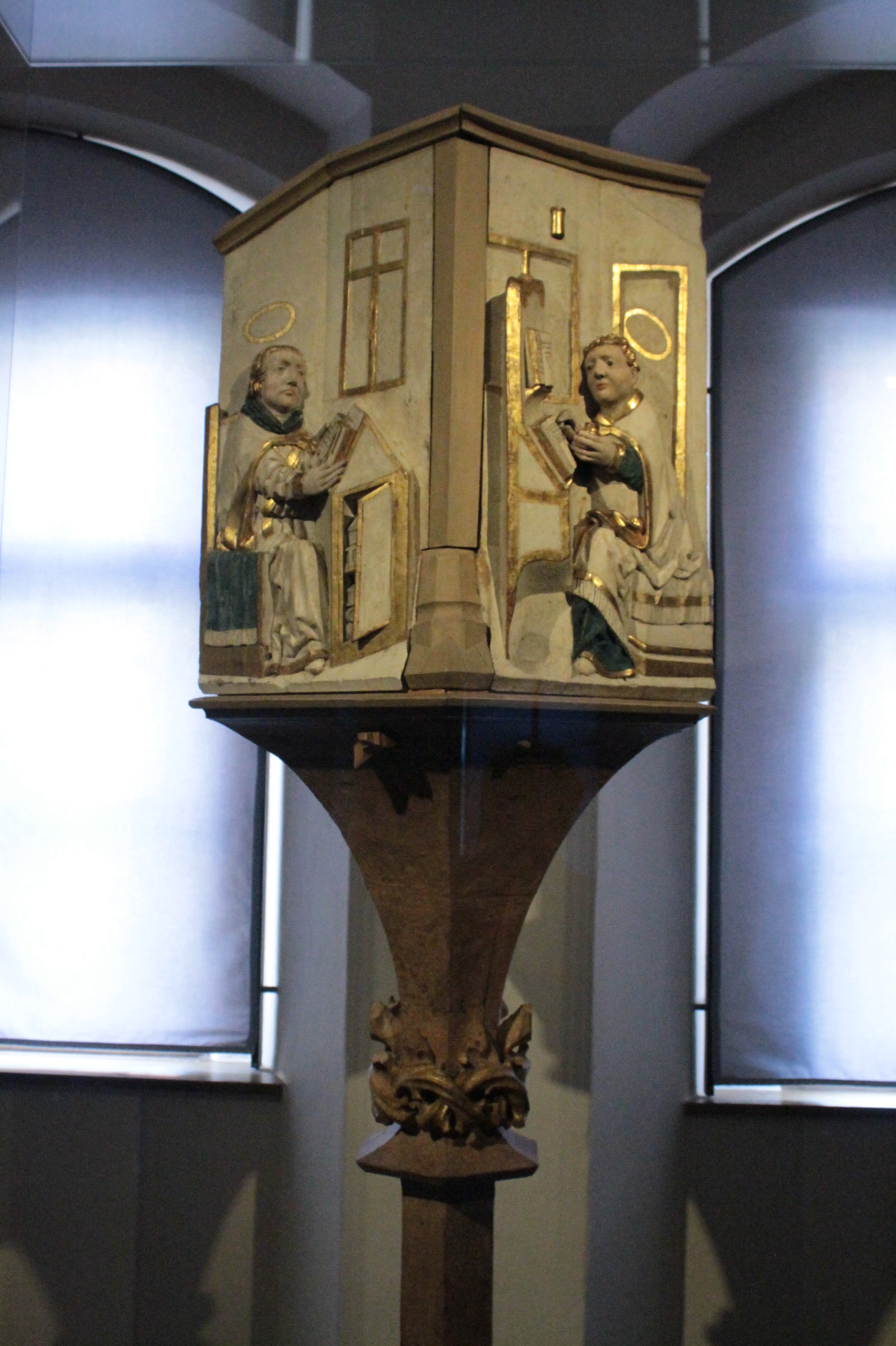
Martin Luther's pulpit c.1525, Lutherhaus, Wittenberg

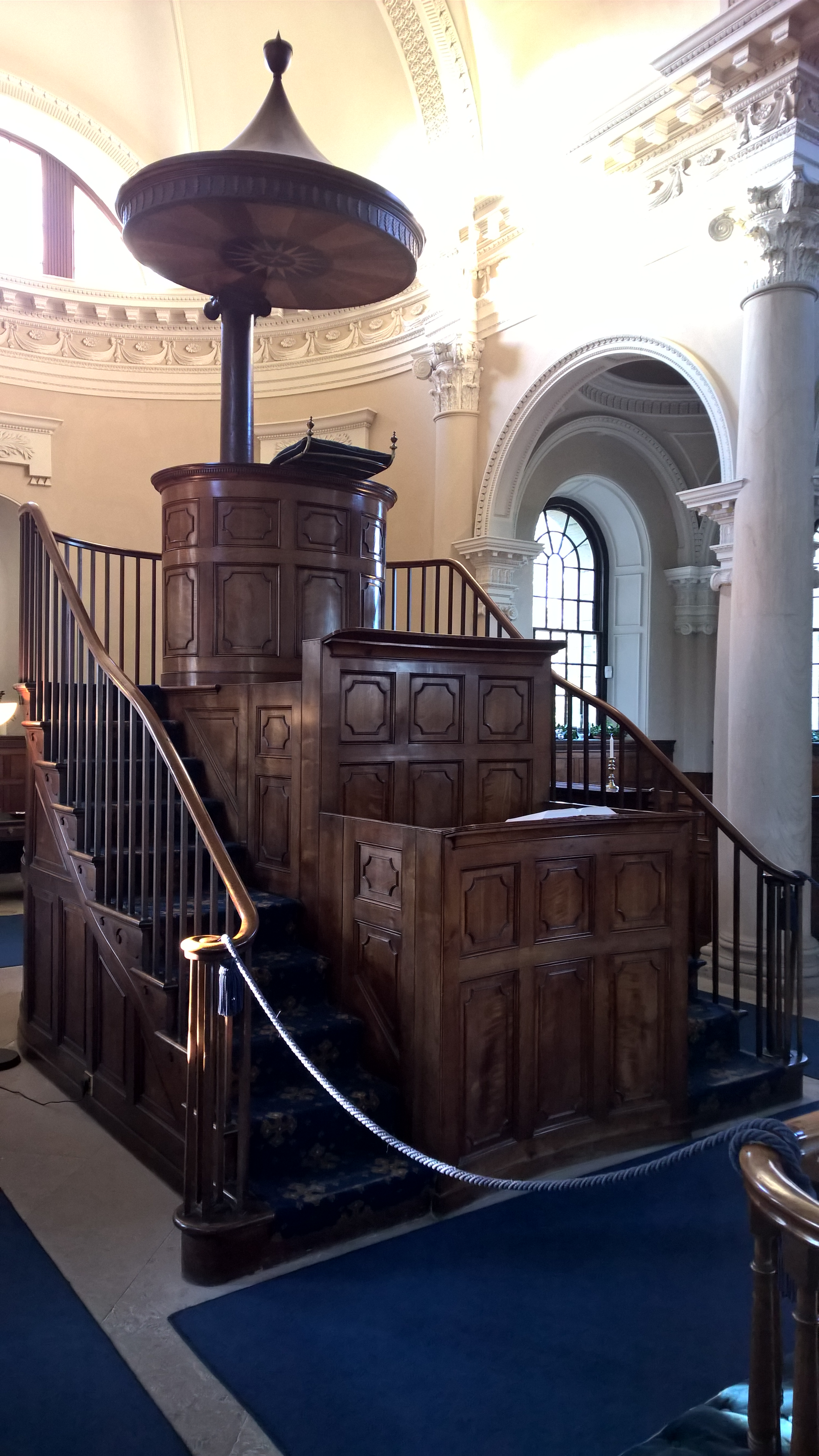
Centrally placed three-decker pulpit at Gibside Chapel, England, a private chapel on the Calvinist edge of Anglicanism.

It is central to Protestant belief that the clergy should preach sermons on Biblical passages to the congregation. To achieve this, some existing churches were adapted to place the clergyman in a position audible to all, which in larger churches usually places this in a visible location, and raised up. This had long been the practice in larger Catholic churches and many smaller ones, but was now made universal. In smaller churches the pulpit remained in the traditional east end of the church, where altars were usually located, but was often raised higher than before.

In Protestant churches, the pulpit is considered one of the most important pieces of furniture in the church. In certain Presbyterian, Anglican and Methodist churches designed with a pulpit-centered chancel, the pulpit is located centrally in relation to the congregation and raised, with the communion table being in front of it. In such churches it may be where the minister stands for most of the service. In the eighteenth century, double-decker and triple-decker pulpits were often introduced in English-speaking countries. The three levels of lecterns were intended to show the relative importance of the readings delivered there. The bottom tier was for the parish clerk, the middle was the reading desk for the minister, and the top tier was reserved for the delivery of the sermon. A good example of a three-decker pulpit is found in St Andrew's Church, Slaidburn, Lancashire. America's only surviving three-decker pulpit on the centerline of the church is at Trinity Church, Newport, Rhode Island. In Lutheran churches, as well as many Anglican and Methodist churches designed with a divided chancel, the pulpit is located on the Gospel side of the chancel (from which the Gospel is read and the sermon is delivered) while a lectern is located on the Epistle side of the sanctuary, with the latter being used by readers to vocalize the other Scripture lessons.

In many Evangelical Christian churches, the pulpit stands squarely in the centre of the platform, and is generally the largest piece of church furniture. This is to symbolise the proclamation of the Word of God as the central focus of the weekly service of worship. In more contemporary evangelical churches, the pulpit may be much smaller, if used at all, and may be carried out after the end of the song service. Often placed in the centre of the platform as well, the item of furniture may be used by both lay and ordained members, in effect doubling as a lectern.

In the 1600s and 1700s, particularly in Lutheran churches in Germany and Scandinavia, the pulpit altar became a popular design in churches, combining the pulpit and the altar.

=== Presbyterian Protestant churches ===
Traditional Presbyterian Churches in Scotland and elsewhere often had a central pulpit, that is, the pulpit was located in the centre of the chancel in the position where most churches have the communion table or altar. The table could be situated in front of the pulpit or to the side, and sometimes was not in the chancel area at all.

This declares the Bible to be the foundation of the faith. Furthermore, the "Centrality of the Word" implies that the reading and preaching of the Bible is the centrepiece of a service of worship, and thus takes priority over the sacraments. The central pulpit is intended to give visual representation of this idea.

Since the late 19th century, the fashion in the Church of Scotland and most other Presbyterian denominations has been for a return to the pre-Reformation layout. Thus many buildings which once had a central pulpit now have a pulpit to the side. See for example Skene Parish Church or Old West Church, Boston, Massachusetts.

This Presbyterian tradition is historically distinct from the tradition of the ambon in Eastern Christianity.

== Eastern Christianity ==
In modern Eastern Christianity the area directly in front of the Beautiful Gates of the iconostasis from which the Gospel is typically read is called the ambon, and the entire low elevation above the level of the nave in front of the iconostasis is called the soleas. In larger churches, the ambo might be distinguished by three curved steps by which one may reach it from the nave. In addition many Orthodox churches, especially Greek-speaking churches, have pulpits for preaching from, which are similar to those in Western Christianity.

In Eastern Orthodox Church cathedrals there is usually a low platform in the center of the nave called the episcopal ambo where the bishop is vested prior to the Divine Liturgy and where he is enthroned until the Little Entrance. If the bishop is serving in a simple parish church, an episcopal ambo is set temporarily in place. There are huge intricately carved wooden pulpits, some of the biggest in India and the world, in the Syrian churches of Kerala, India

In addition to the ambo, many major churches in Greece and Cyprus also have a raised pulpit on the left side of the nave, usually attached to a column and raised several feet high. This is reached by a narrow flight of stairs. It is considered an architectural element that is symmetrical to the bishop's throne, which is located in an equivalent position on the right. Pulpit and throne are usually similar in construction, usually made of either sculpted stone or sculpted wood. This pulpit was used mostly for sermons and in order to improve audibility, before the advent of modern public address systems in churches. Nowadays it is used rarely. Tradition dictates that it be used for the reading of the "12 Passion Gospels" during the Matins of Holy Friday, served late in the evening of Maundy Thursday. This is done to signify that the Passion of Christ is being "broadcast" for all to know. In the same spirit, a phonetic transcription of the relevant Gospel passages is provided in several common languages (e.g. English, French, Russian, Arabic etc.), so that they may be read from this pulpit at the same time.

== Decorations ==
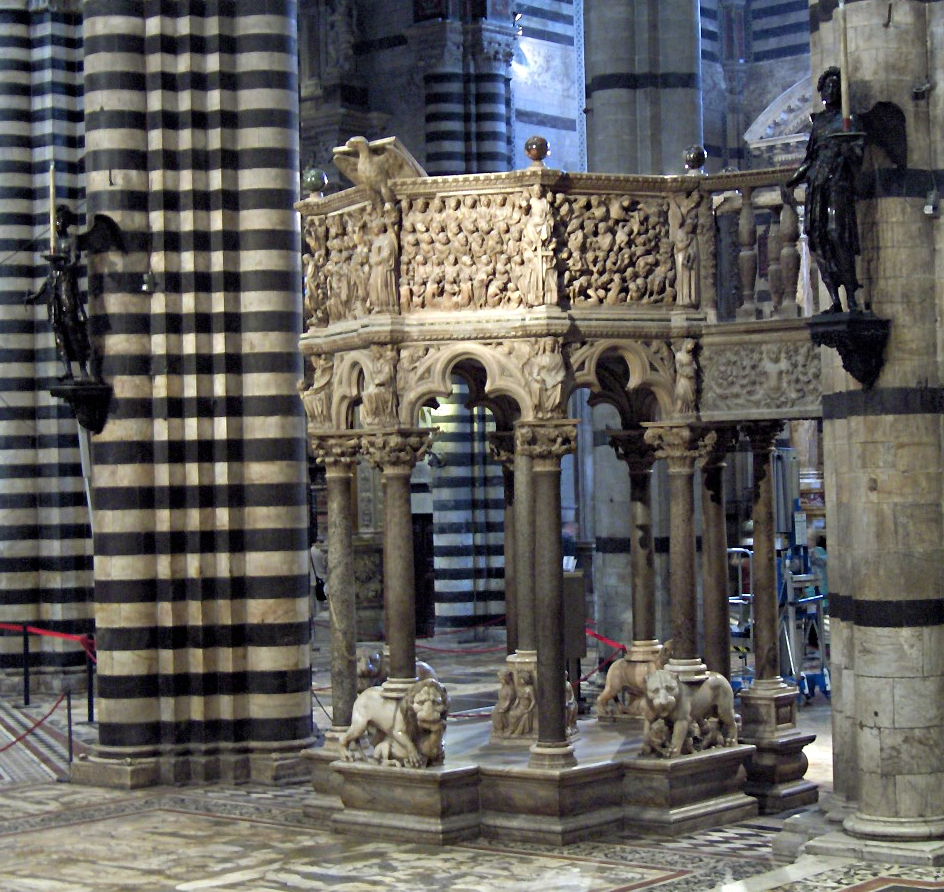
Siena Cathedral Pulpit, by Nicola Pisano, 1268

The exterior of a wood or stone pulpit may be decorated, especially with carved reliefs, and in the centuries after the Protestant Reformation these were sometimes, especially in Lutheran churches, one of the few areas of the church left with figurative decoration such as scenes from the Life of Christ. Pulpit reliefs were especially important at the start of the Italian Renaissance, including those from the Pisa Baptistry (1260) and Siena Cathedral Pulpit (1265–68) by Nicola Pisano, the Pulpit of Sant' Andrea, Pistoia by Giovanni Pisano (1301), and those by Donatello

Elements of decoration shared between Catholic and Protestant denominations are the flowers that may be placed in front of the pulpit, and the antependium or "pulpit fall", a piece of cloth that covers the top of the book-stand in the pulpit and hangs down a short way at the front. It is often of a rich material and decorated with Christian symbols. Flags and banners used by church-related organizations may also stand on the floor around the pulpit.

In the Reformed tradition, though avoiding figurative art, pulpits were increasingly important as a focus for the church, with the sanctuary now comparatively bare and de-emphasized, and were often larger and more elaborately decorated than in medieval churches.

The bookstand of the pulpit (usually in medieval churches) or lectern (common in Anglican churches) may be formed in the shape of an eagle. The eagle symbolizes the gospels, and shows where these were read from at the time the eagle was placed there. When pulpits like those by the Pisani with eagles in stone on them were built the gospel reading was done from the pulpit.

The spread of the sounding board offered artists decorating Catholic Baroque churches a space for spectacular features of various types on top of it. An artistic conceit largely confined to the 18th-century Rococo churches of South Germany was to shape the body of the pulpit as a ship, to utilize the old metaphor of the church as a ship. This allowed for fantastical plaster or wood decoration of sails and rigging manned by angels above, and apostles hauling in nets below.

== Gallery ==
=== Outdoor pulpits ===
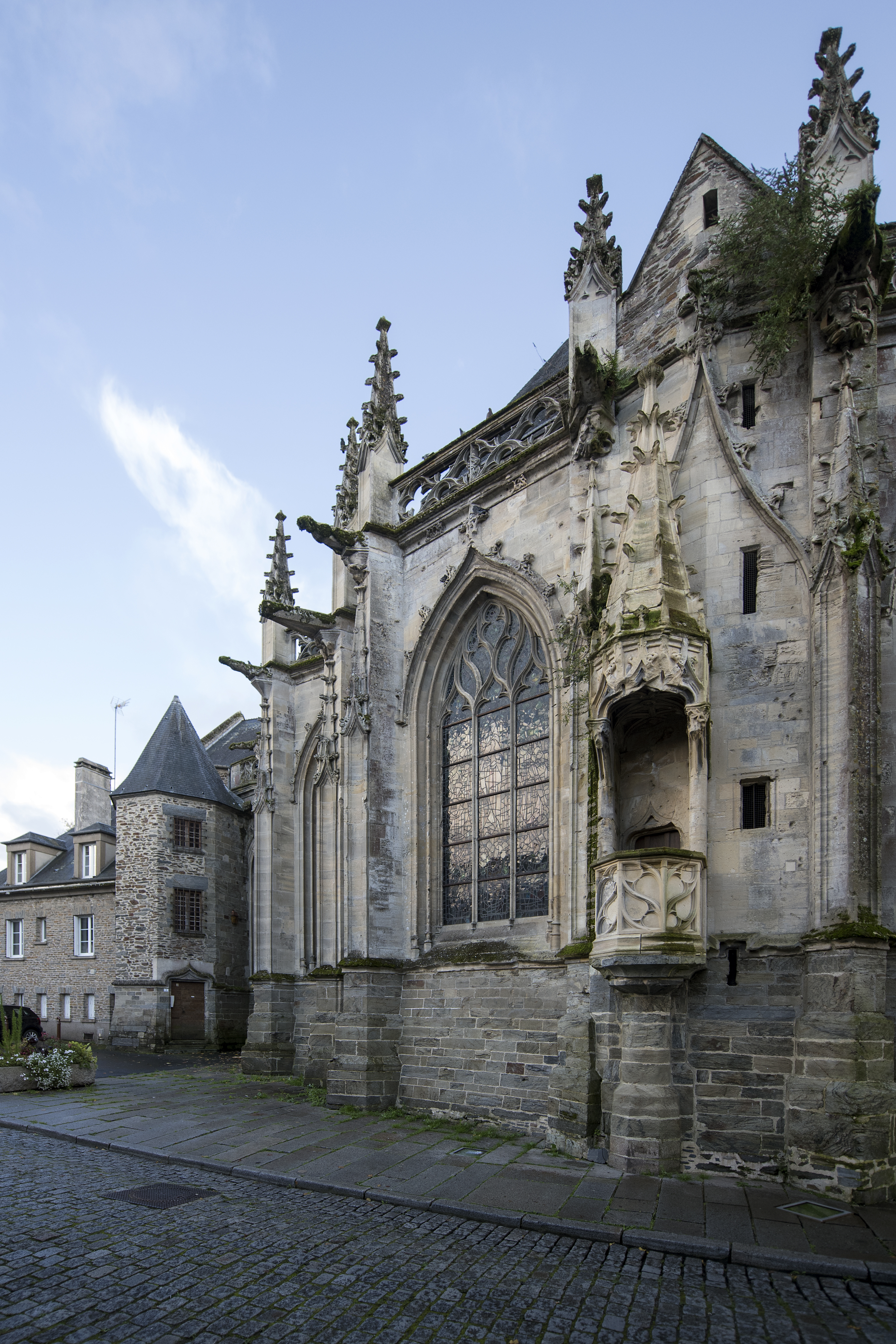
External gothic pulpit in Saint-Lô, France

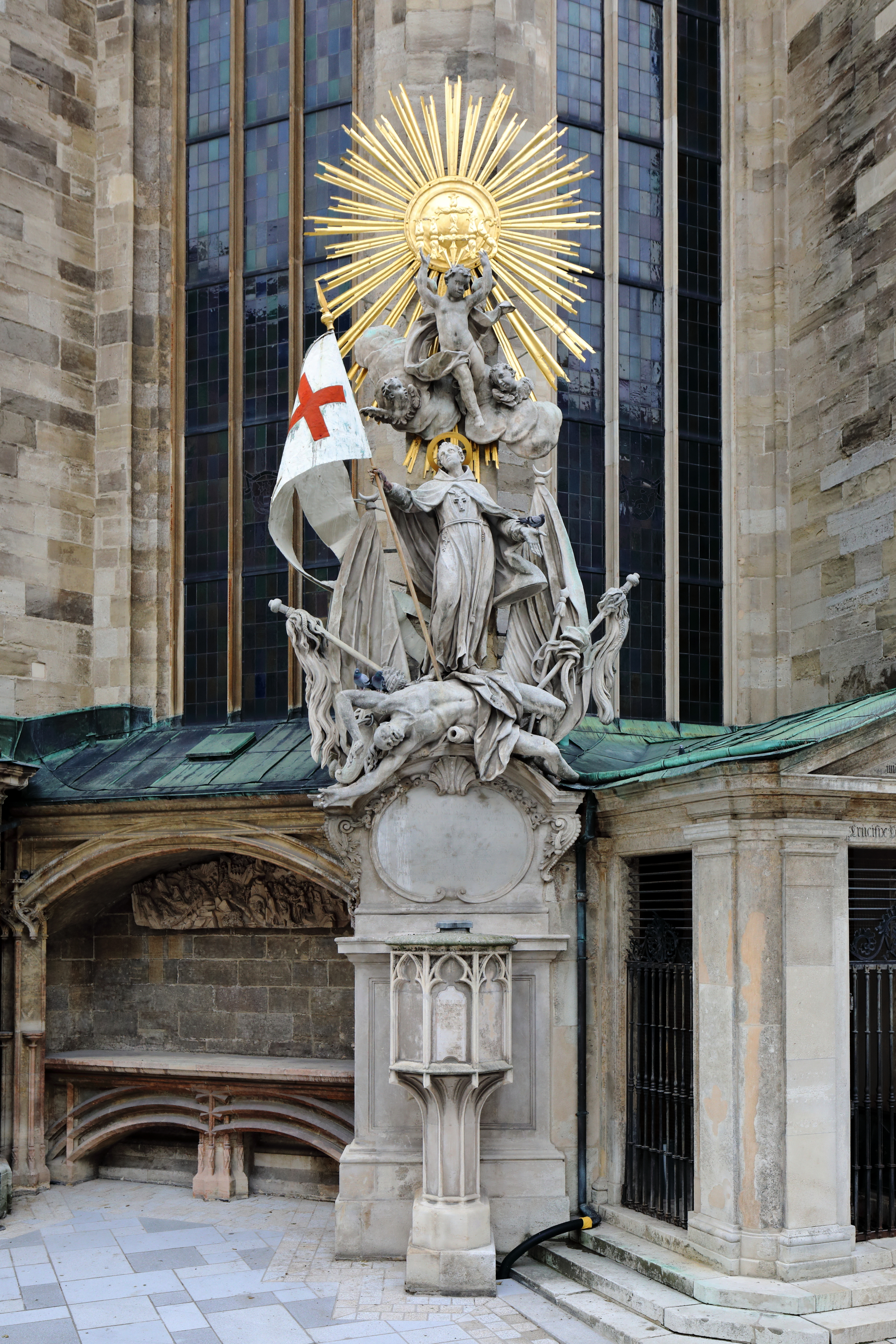
Outdoor pulpit of Giovanni da Capistrano, Vienna Austria

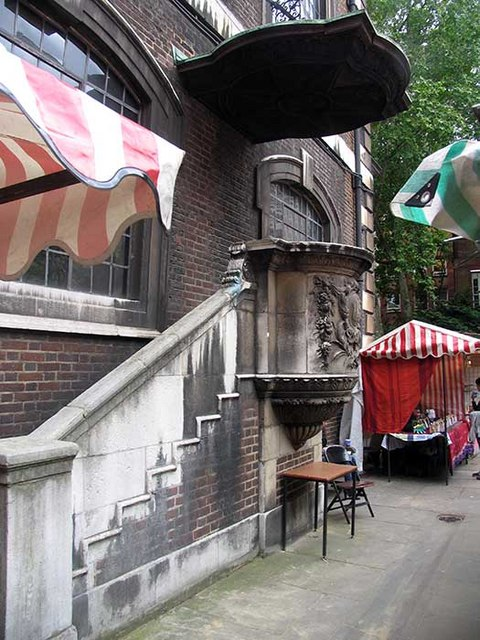
St James's Church, Piccadilly, in the centre of London, 1680s

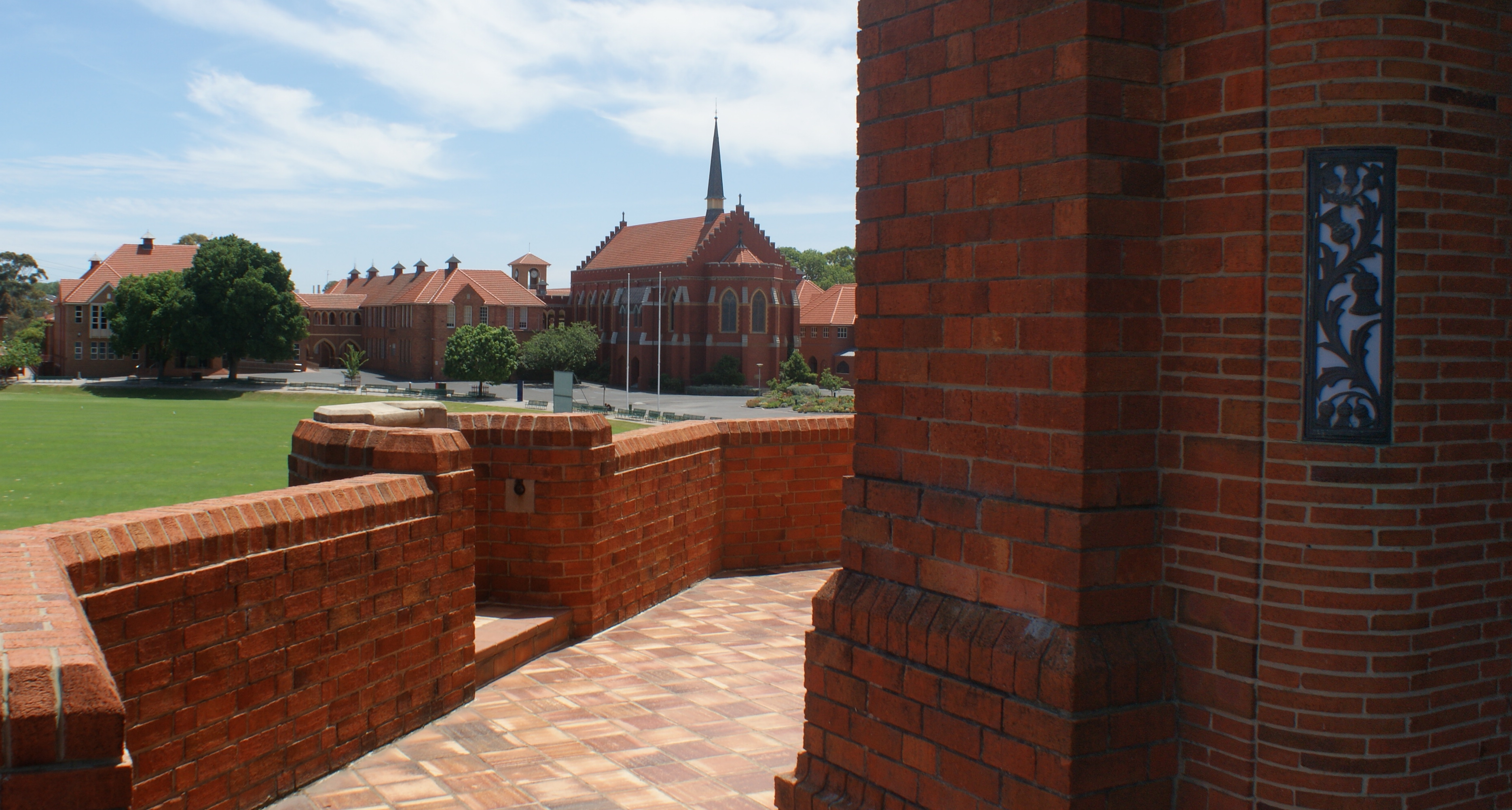
Open-air pulpit in the forecourt of the Chapel at Scotch College, Melbourne

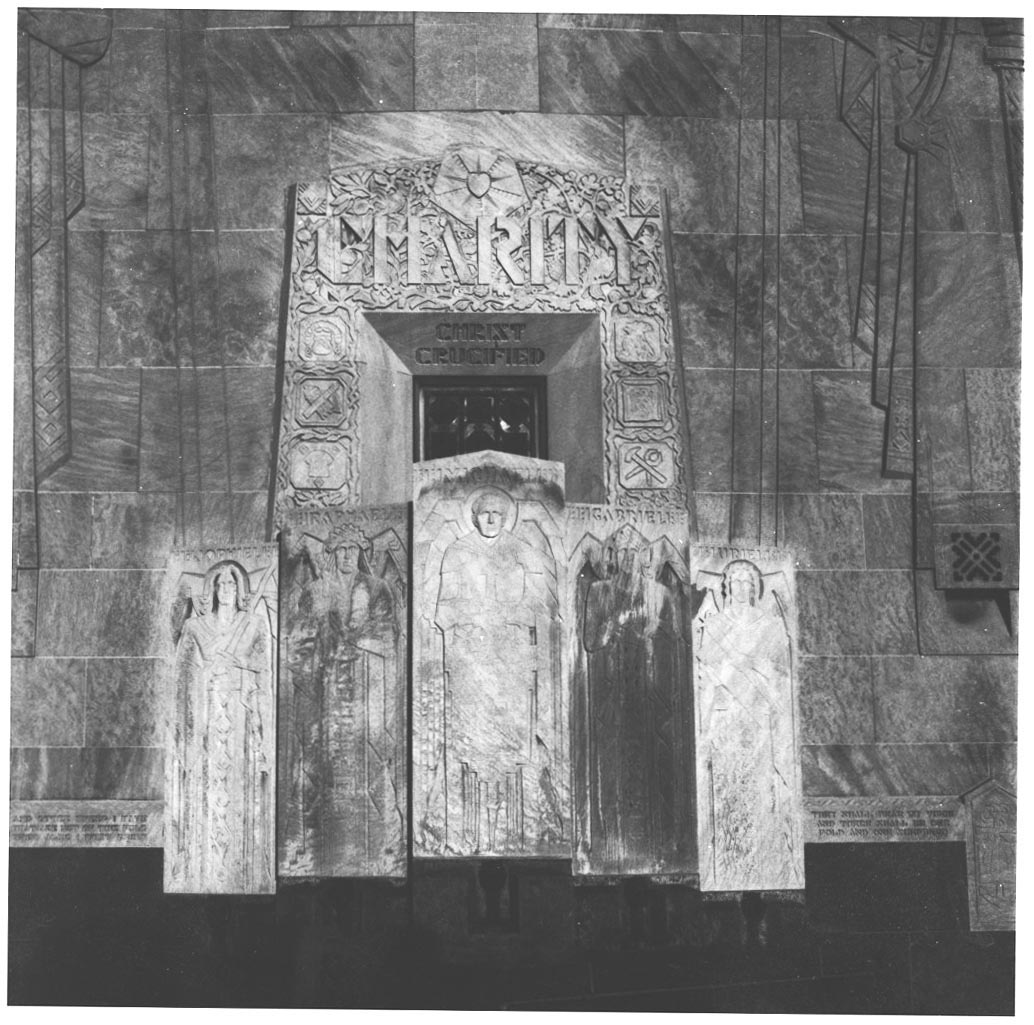
Fr. Coughlin's outdoor pulpit at the Shrine of the Little Flower in Royal Oak, Michigan.

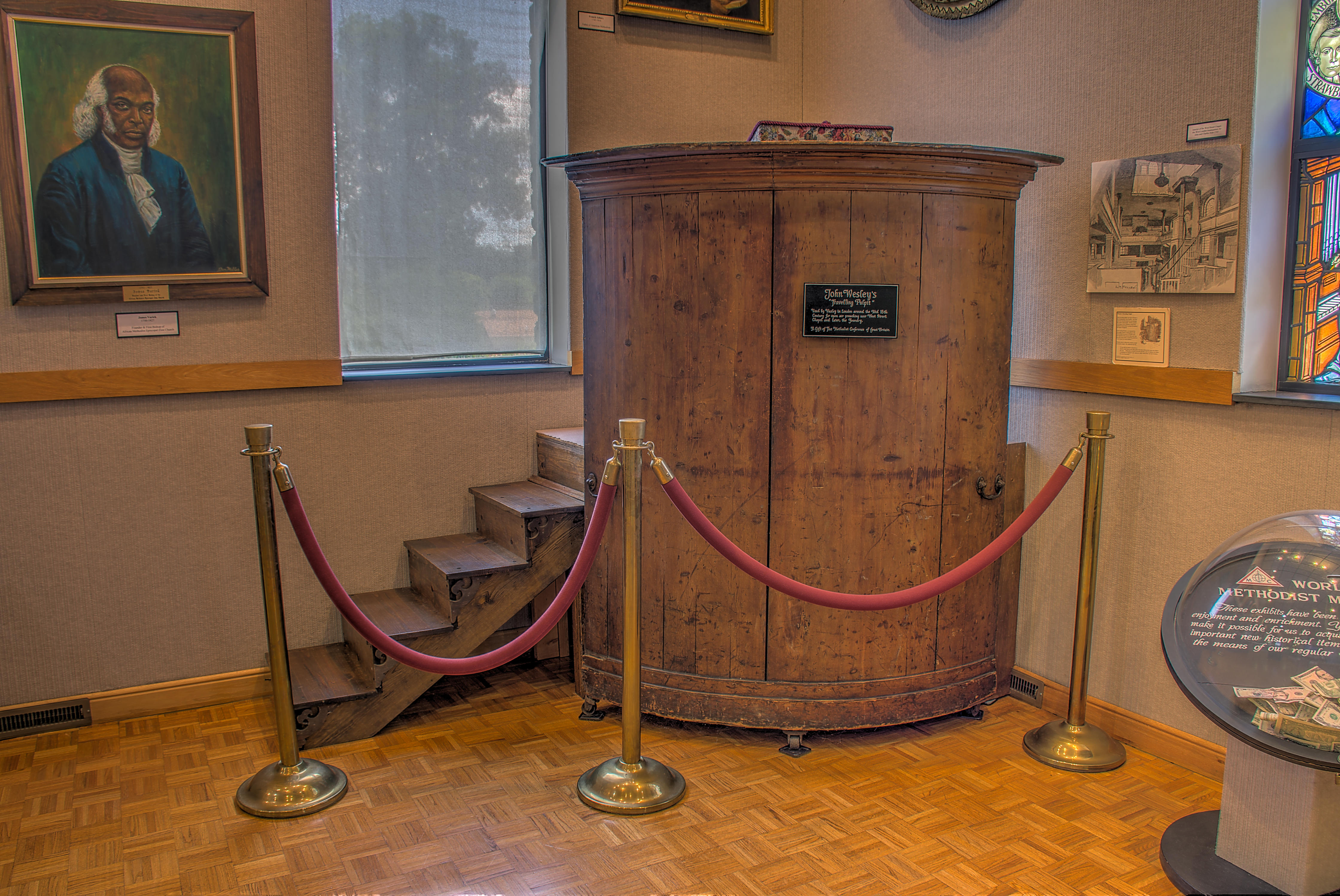
John Wesley's Traveling Pulpit at the World Methodist Museum, Lake Junaluska, NC

=== Modern pulpits ===
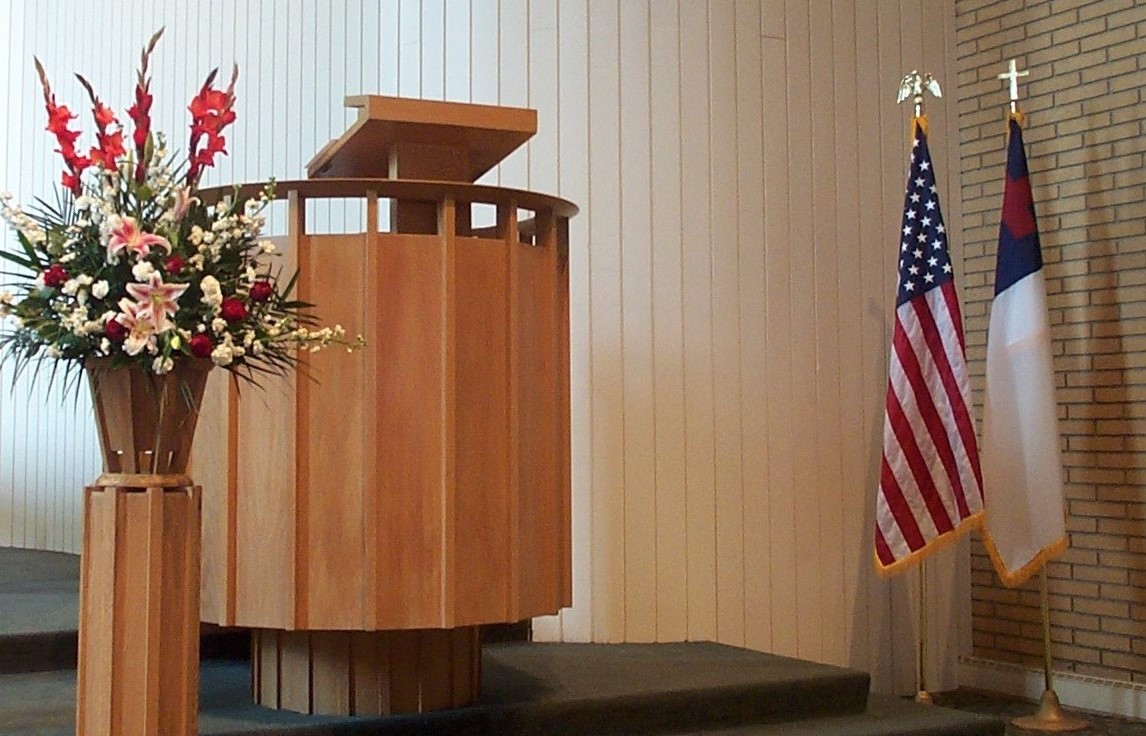
A modern pulpit on the chancel of a Presbyterian Church in California

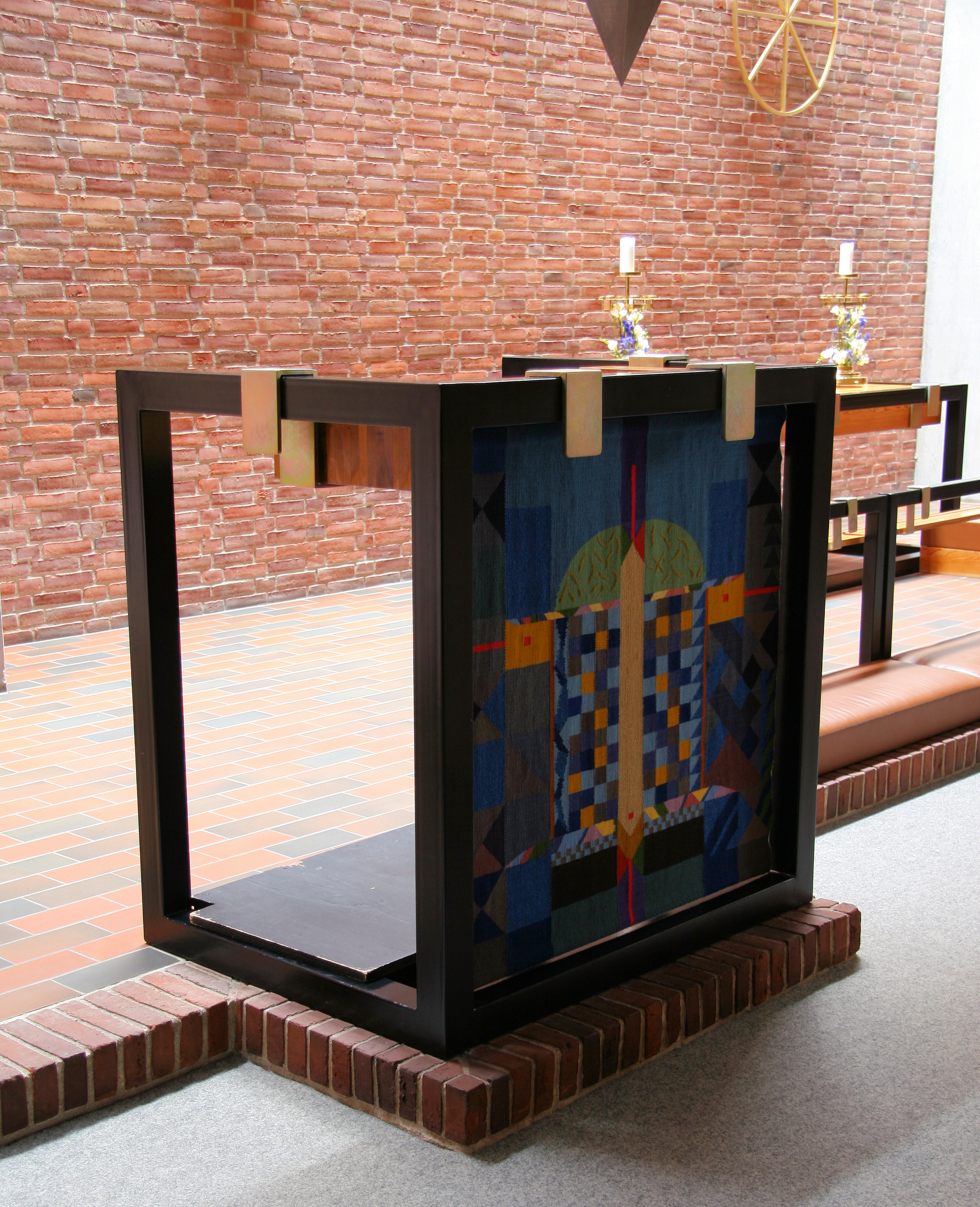
A modern pulpit in Jakobskirken, Roskilde, Denmark.

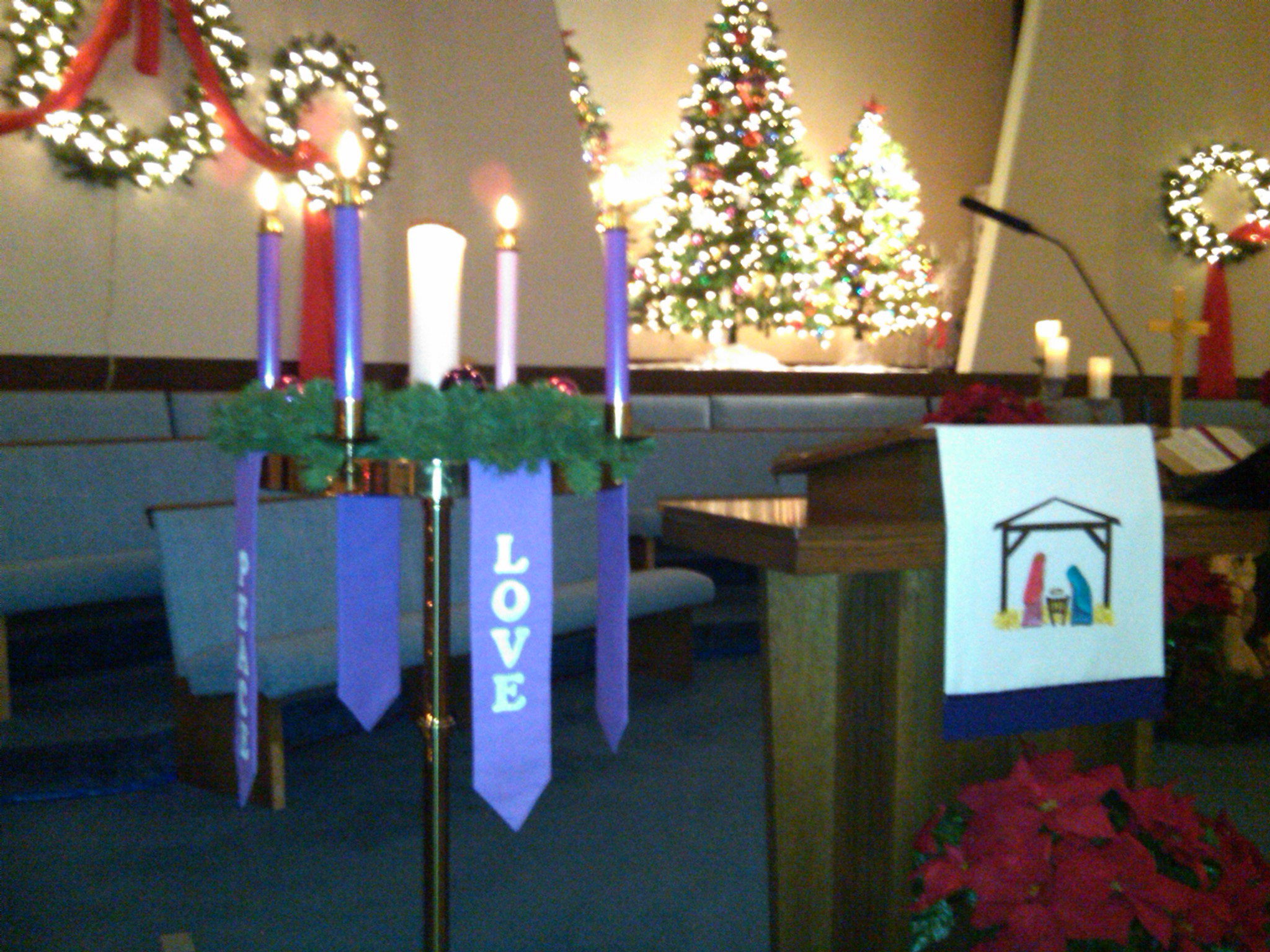
A pulpit in the chancel of a Methodist church in Ohio

=== Older pulpits ===
The pulpit of Nederluleå Church in Norrbotten County, Sweden

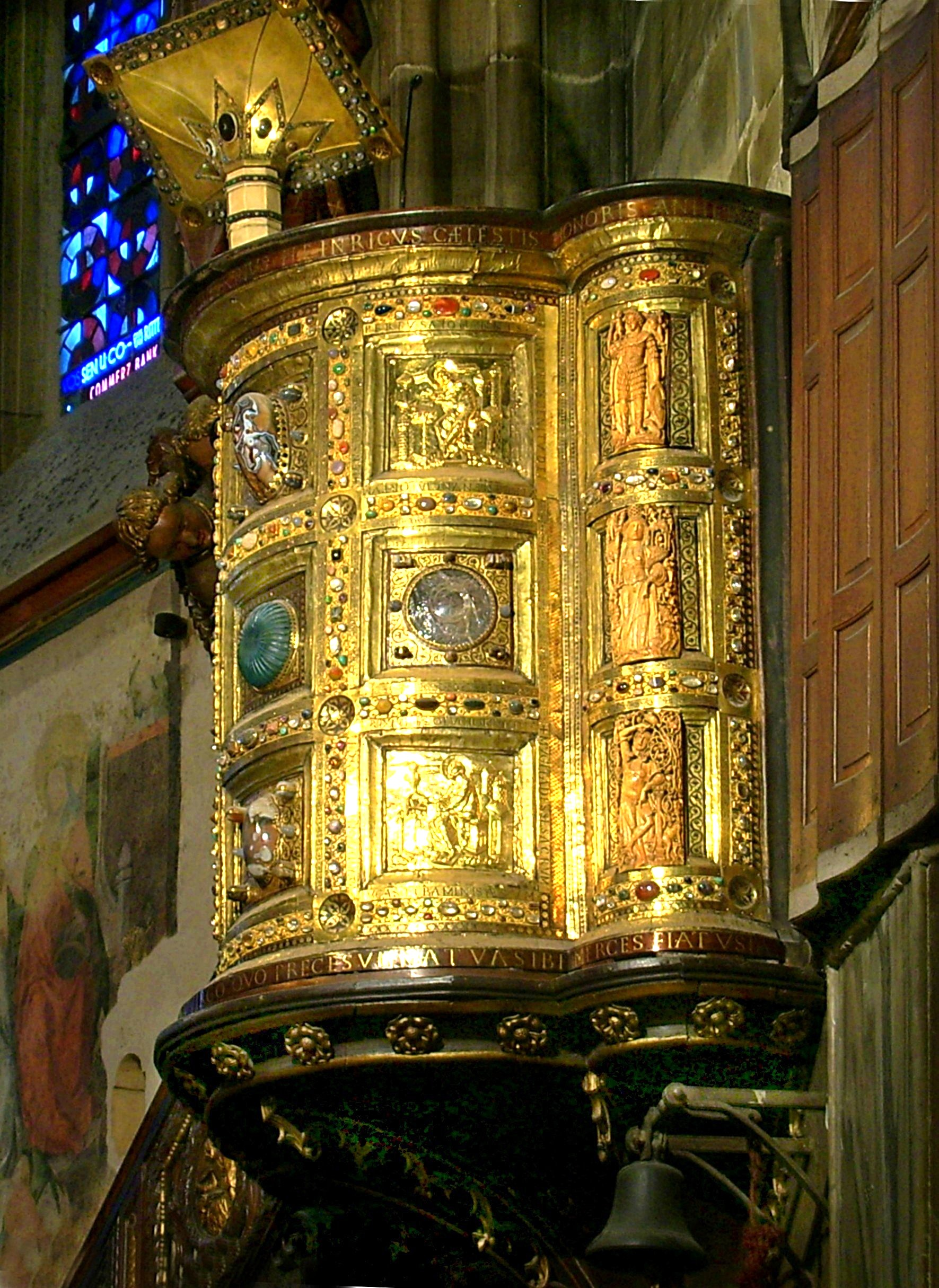
Ambon of Henry II (1014), Aachen Cathedral

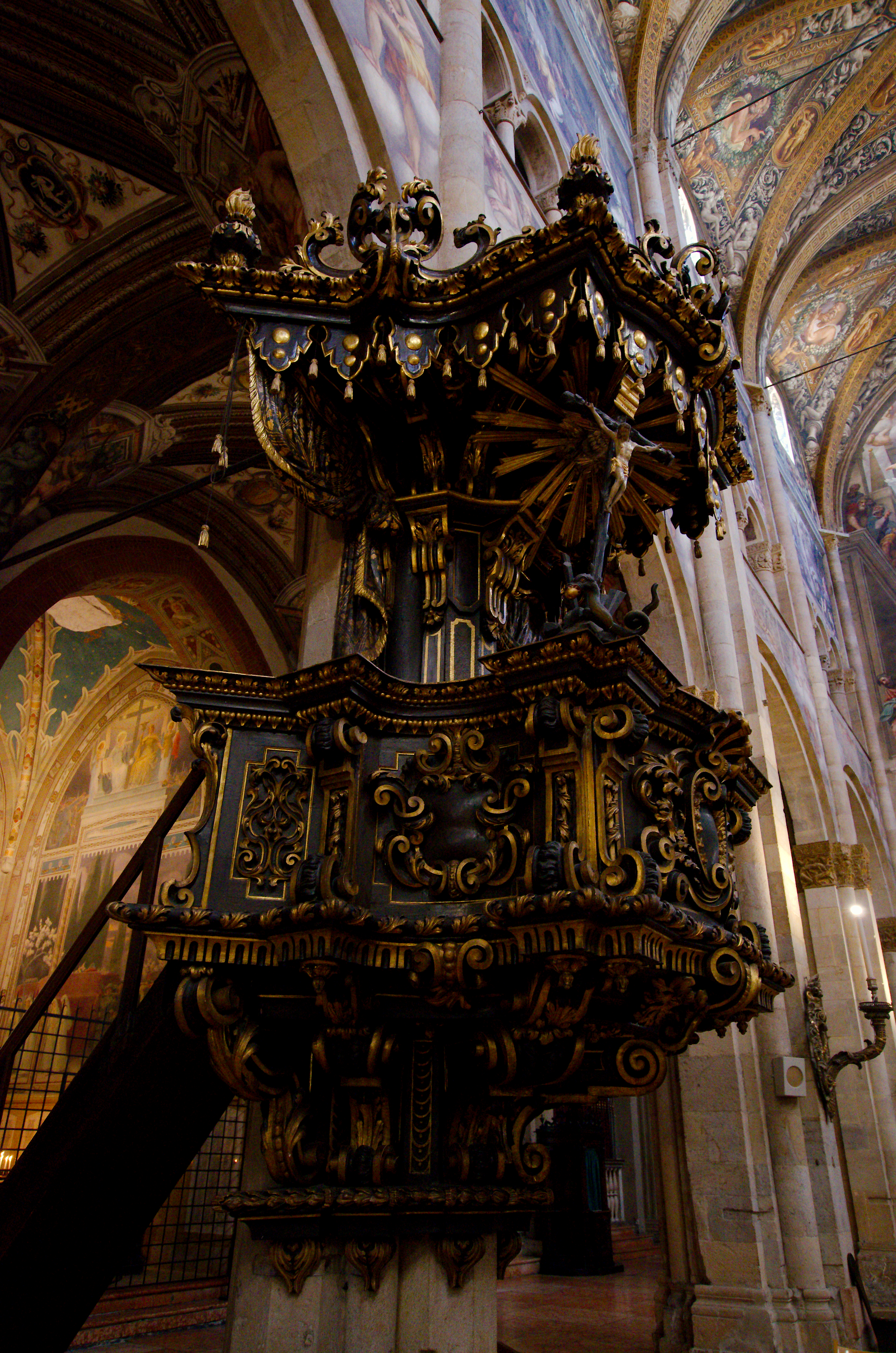
Baroque pulpit of 1613 carved in wood by Paolo Froni Parma Cathedral

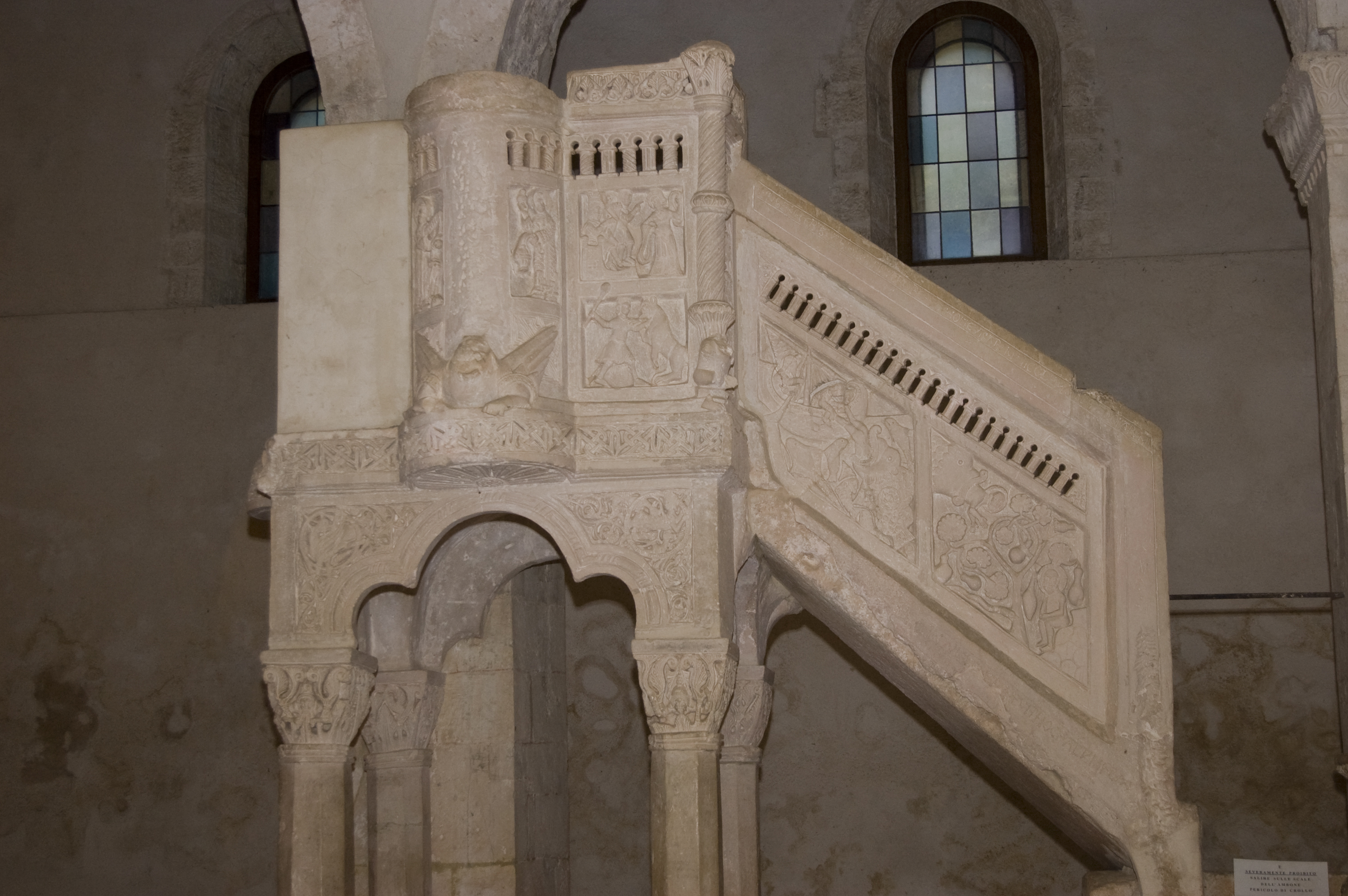
Italian pulpit of 1150 or older

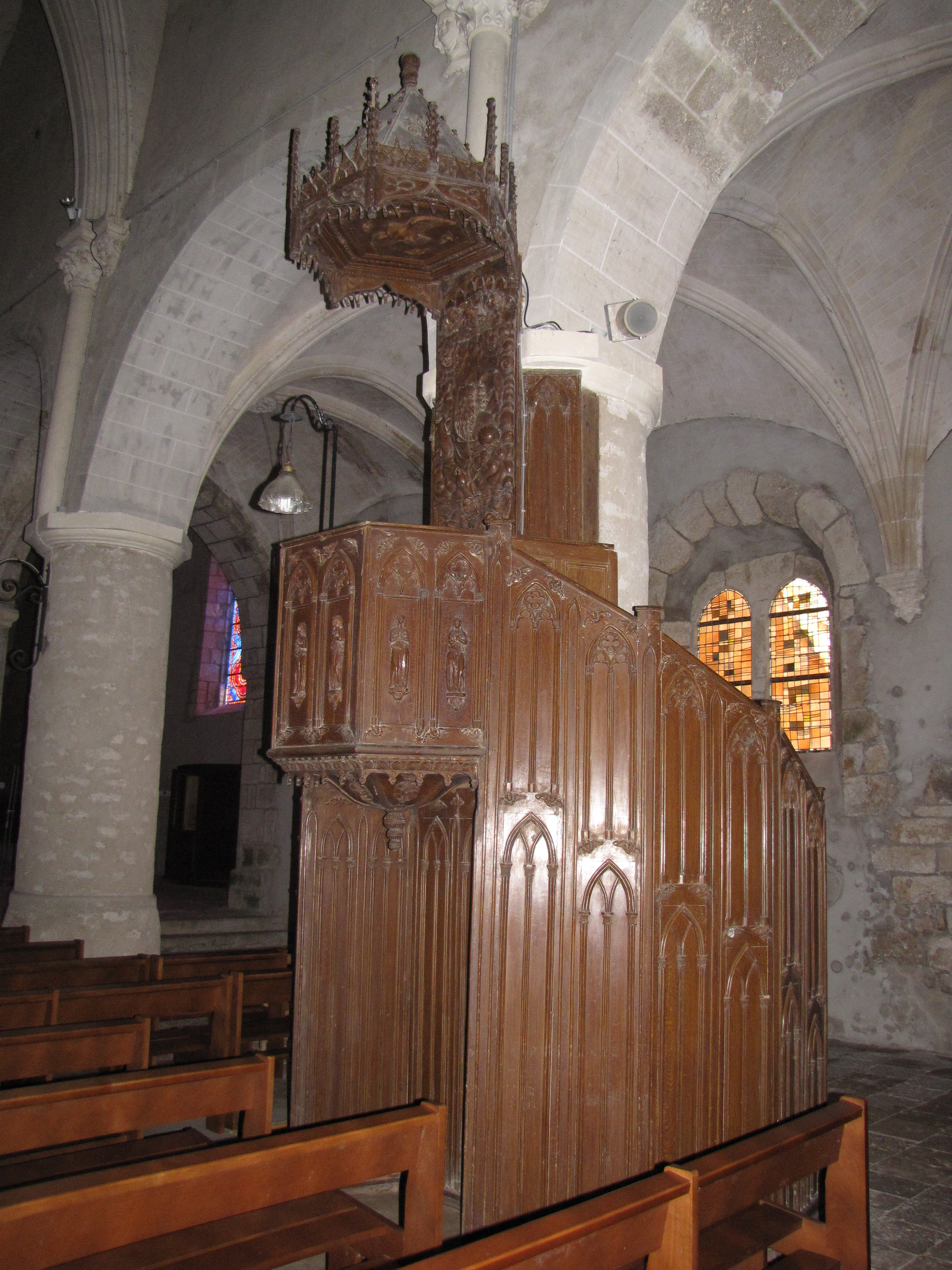
Gothic wood, France

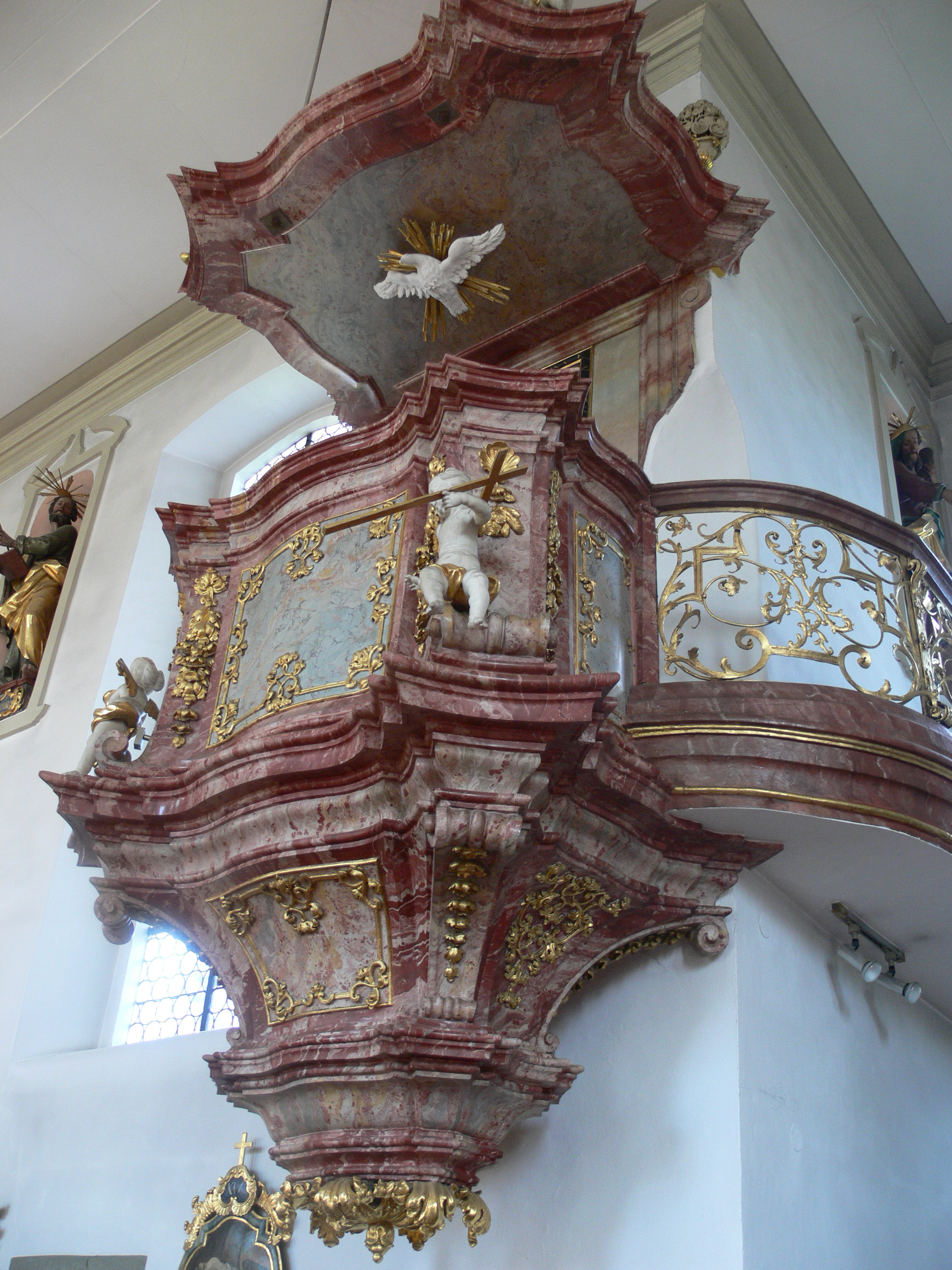
Late Baroque polychromed wood in a South German pilgrimage church

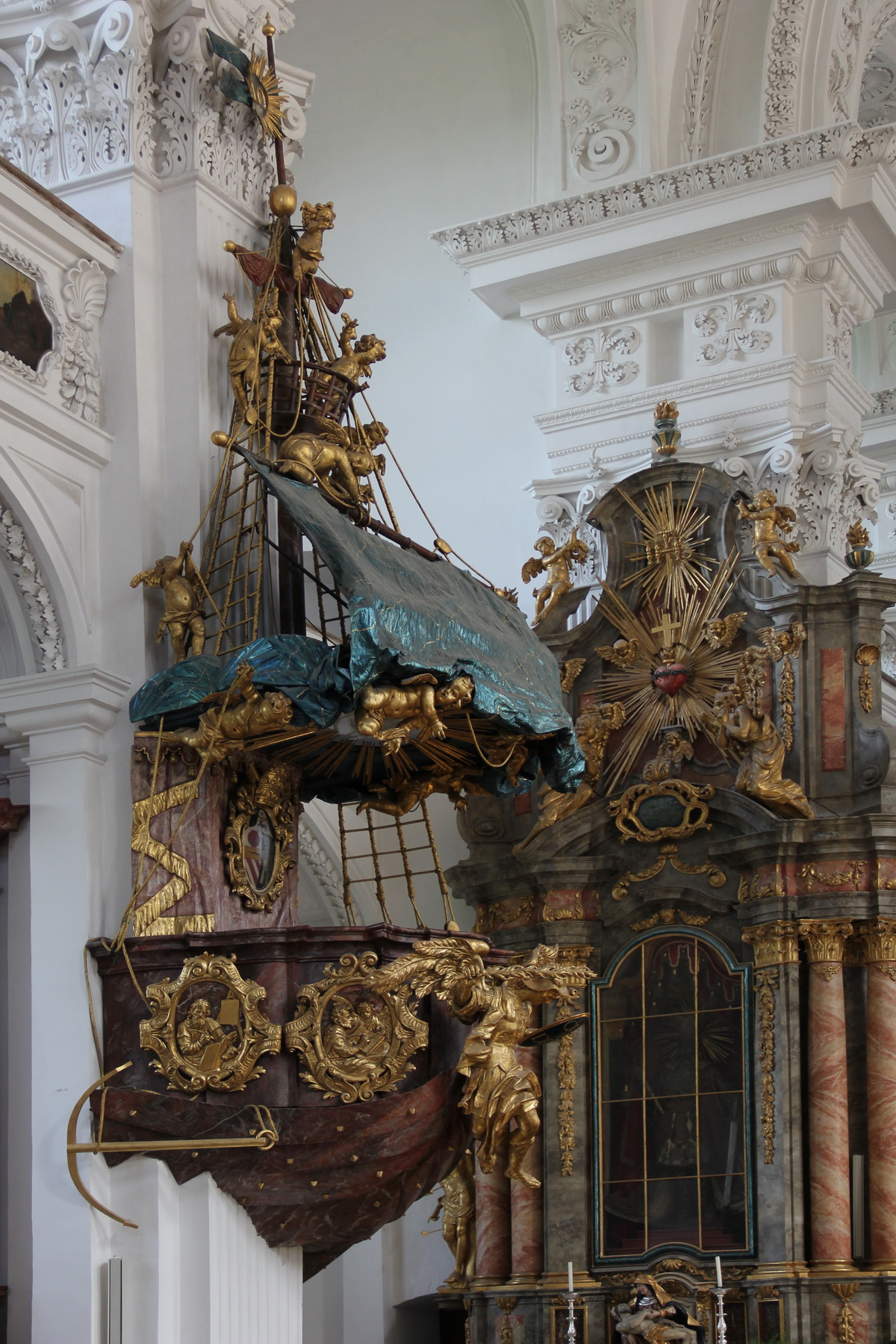
Pulpit in Irsee Abbey, Bavaria in the shape of a ship's prow

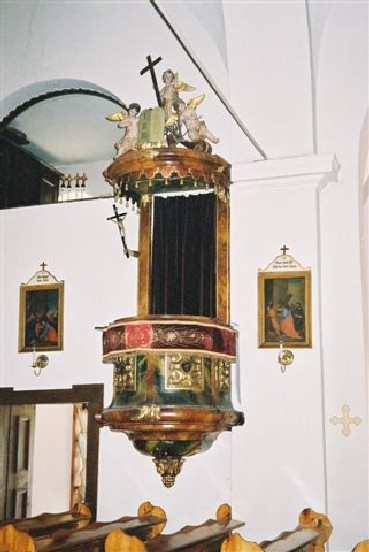
A late 18th-century pulpit in a small Catholic church in Spielfeld, Styria, Austria.

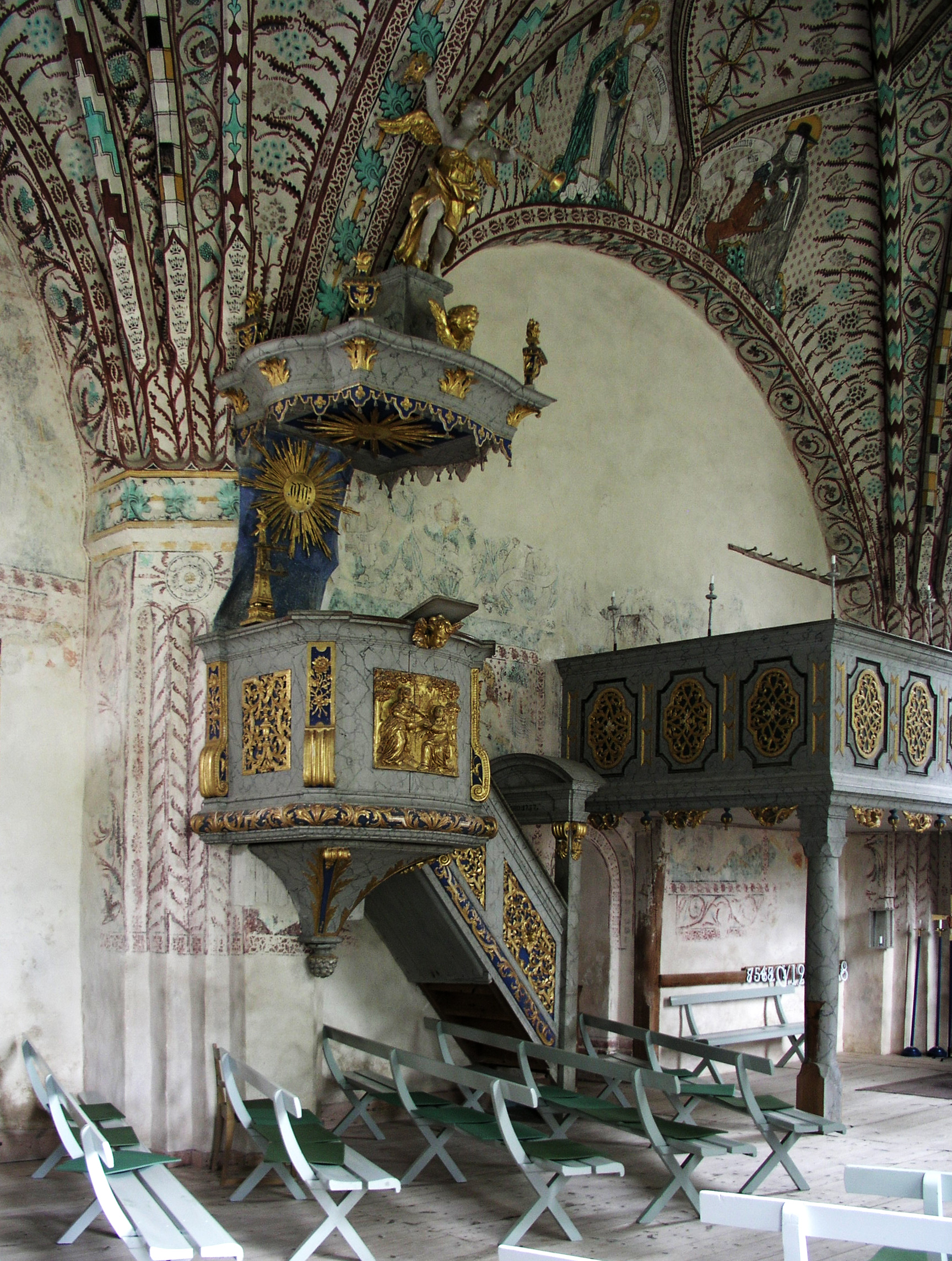
Enånger old church in Sweden

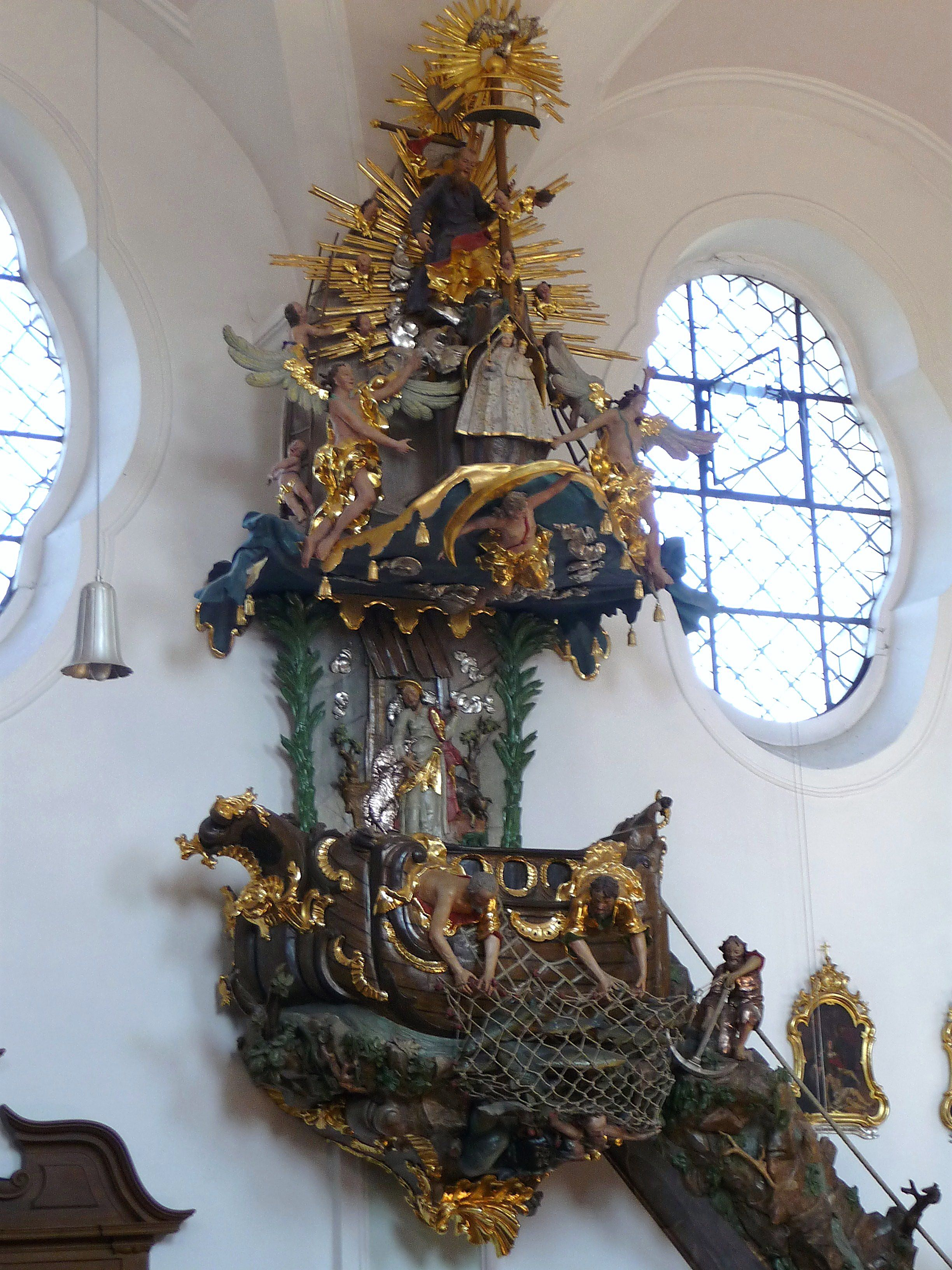
boat-shaped German Rococo pulpit

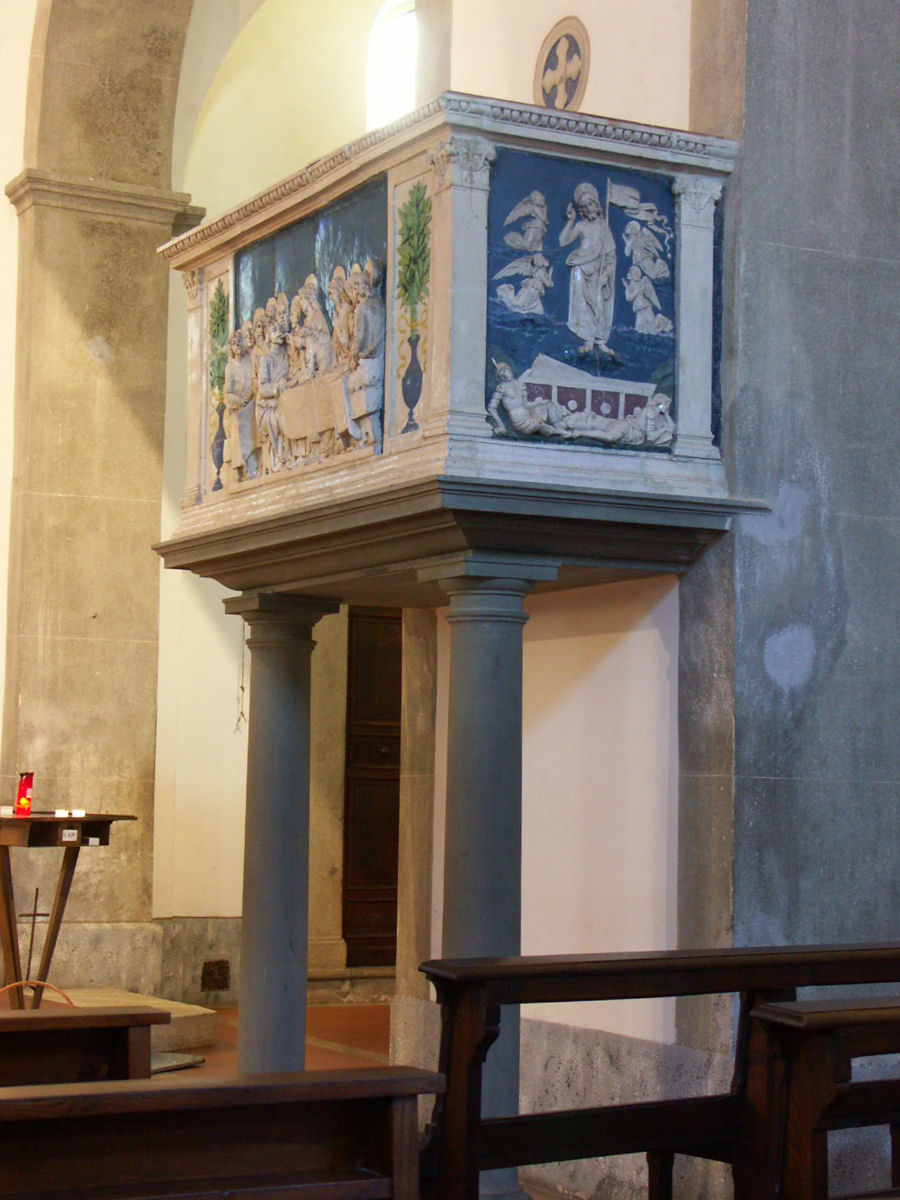
Terracotta Pieve delle Sante Flora e Lucilla in Santa Fiora, Italy

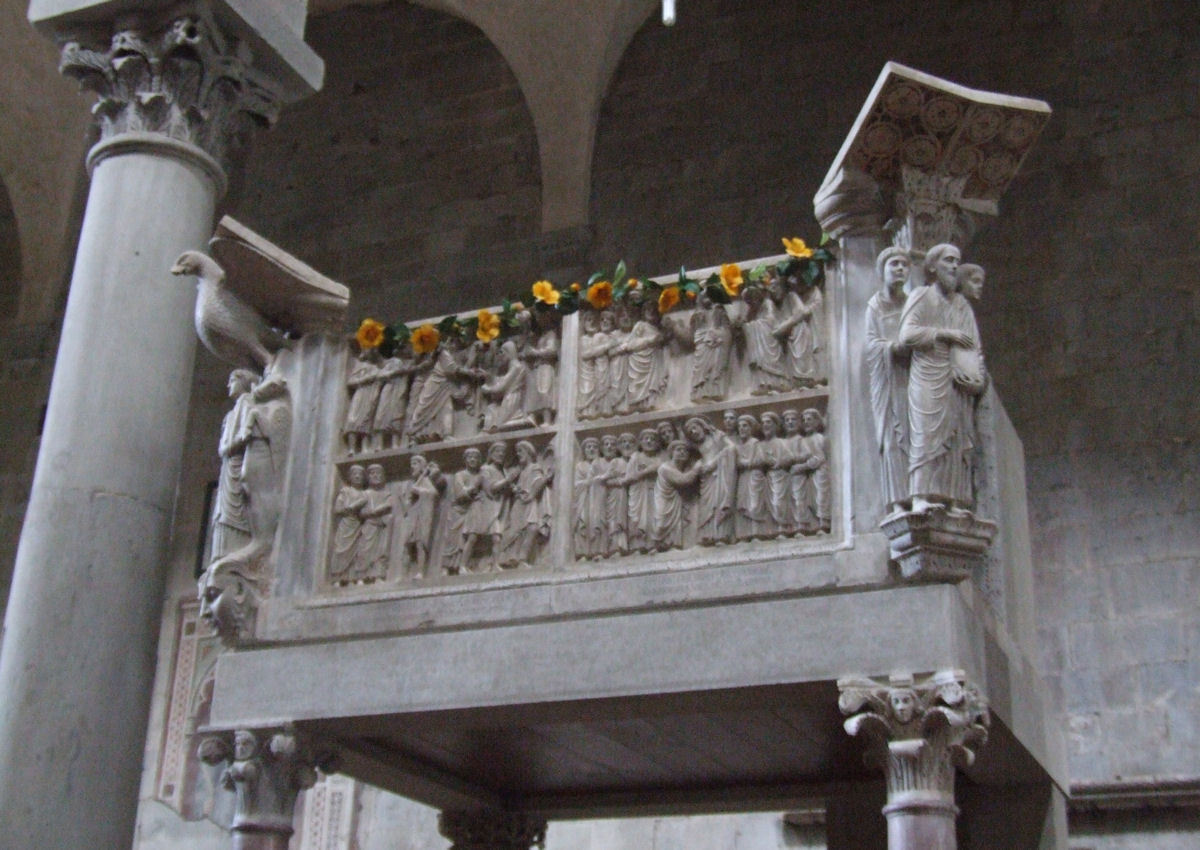
Stone pulpit at Chiesa Bartolomeo in Pantano Pistoia Italy

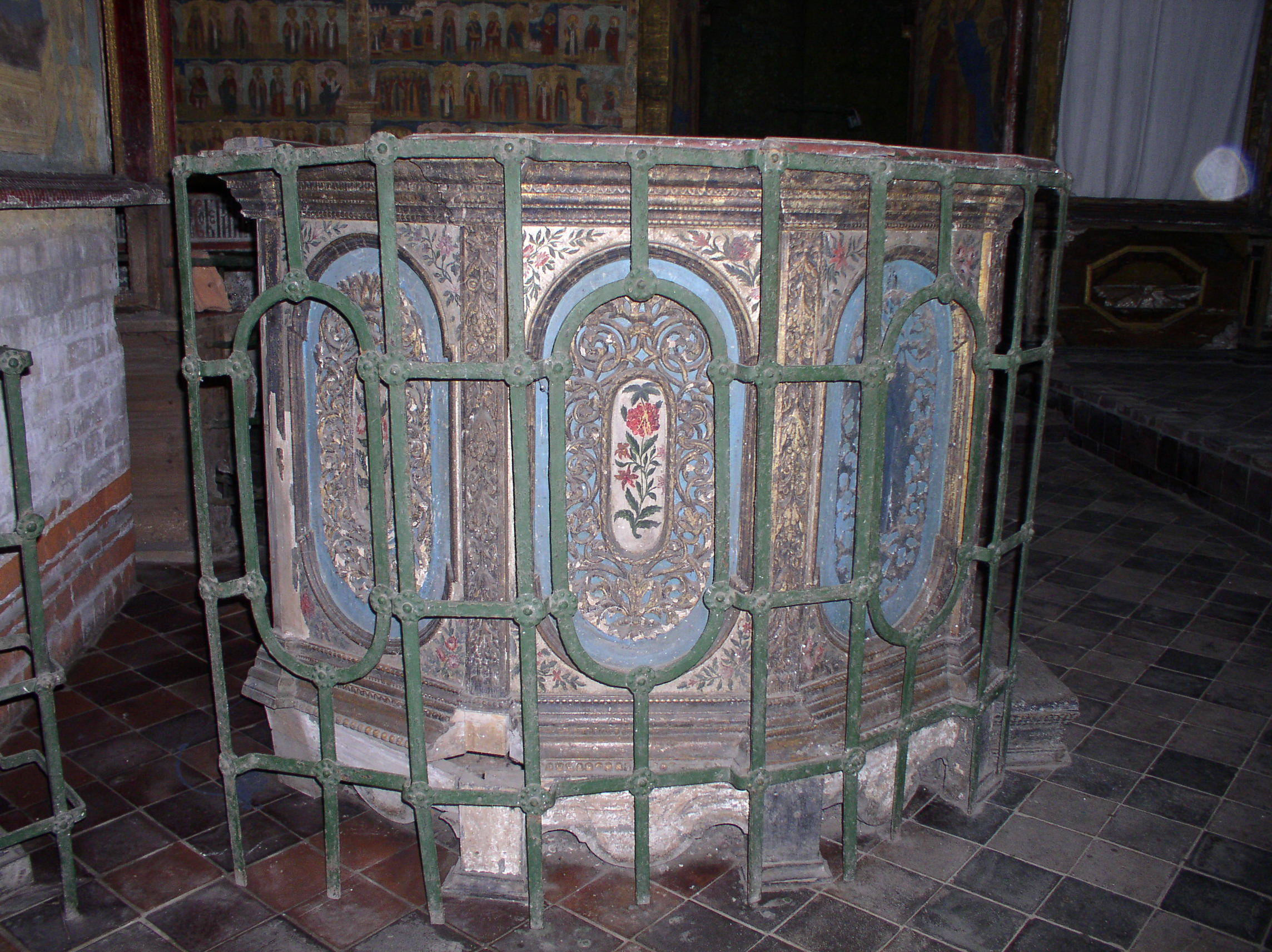
Pulpit at St. John the Baptist Cathedral, Yaroslavl, Russia (17th century)

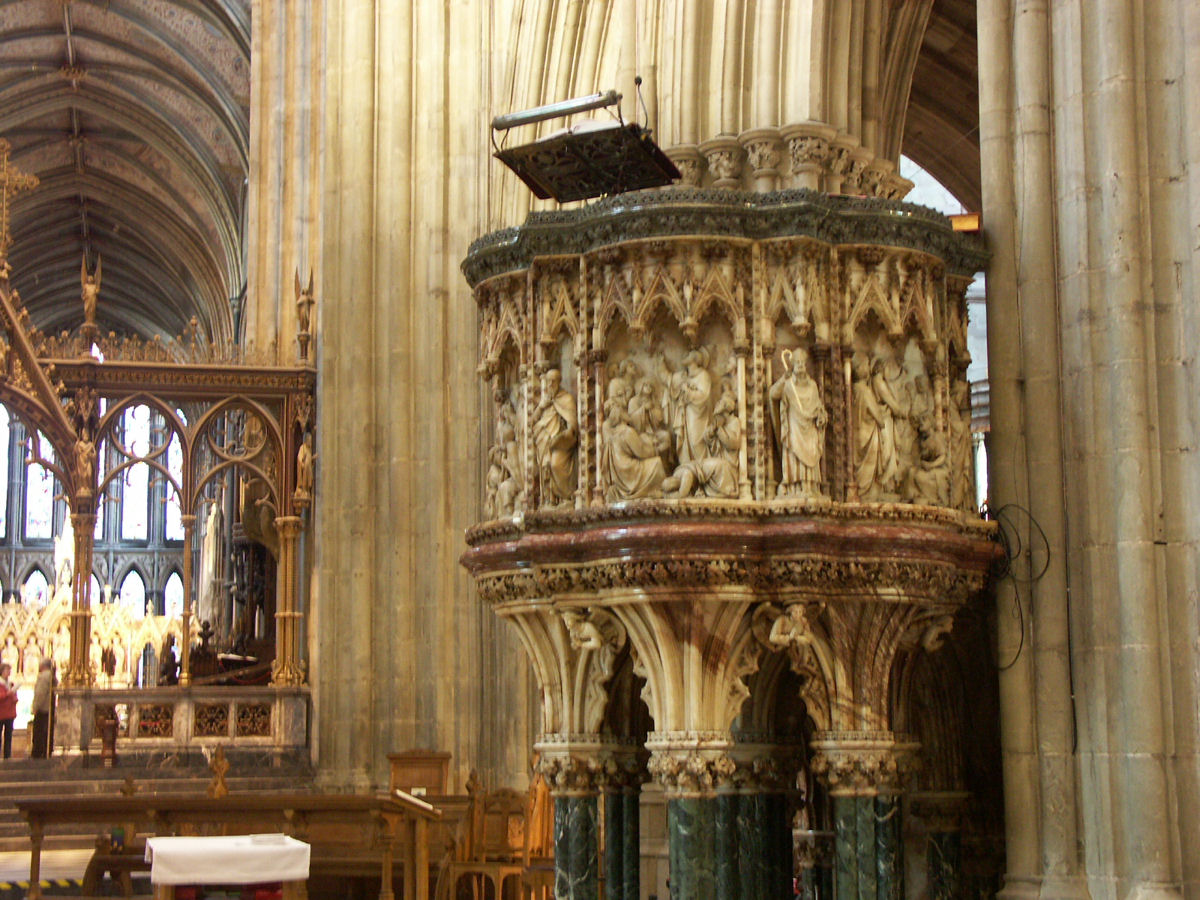
Stone pulpit at Worcester Cathedral England

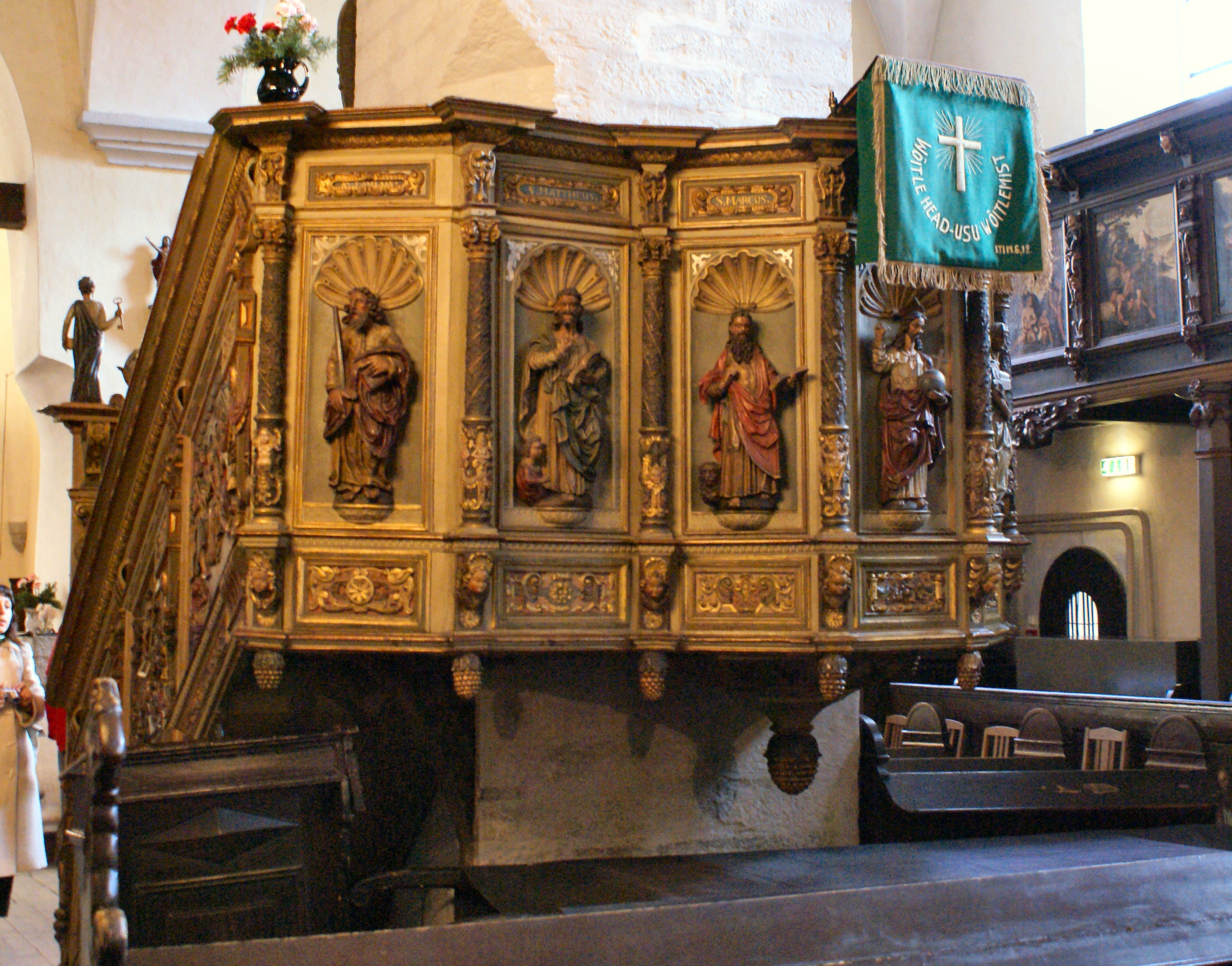
Wooden pulpit at the Church of the Holy Ghost in Tallinn in Estonia

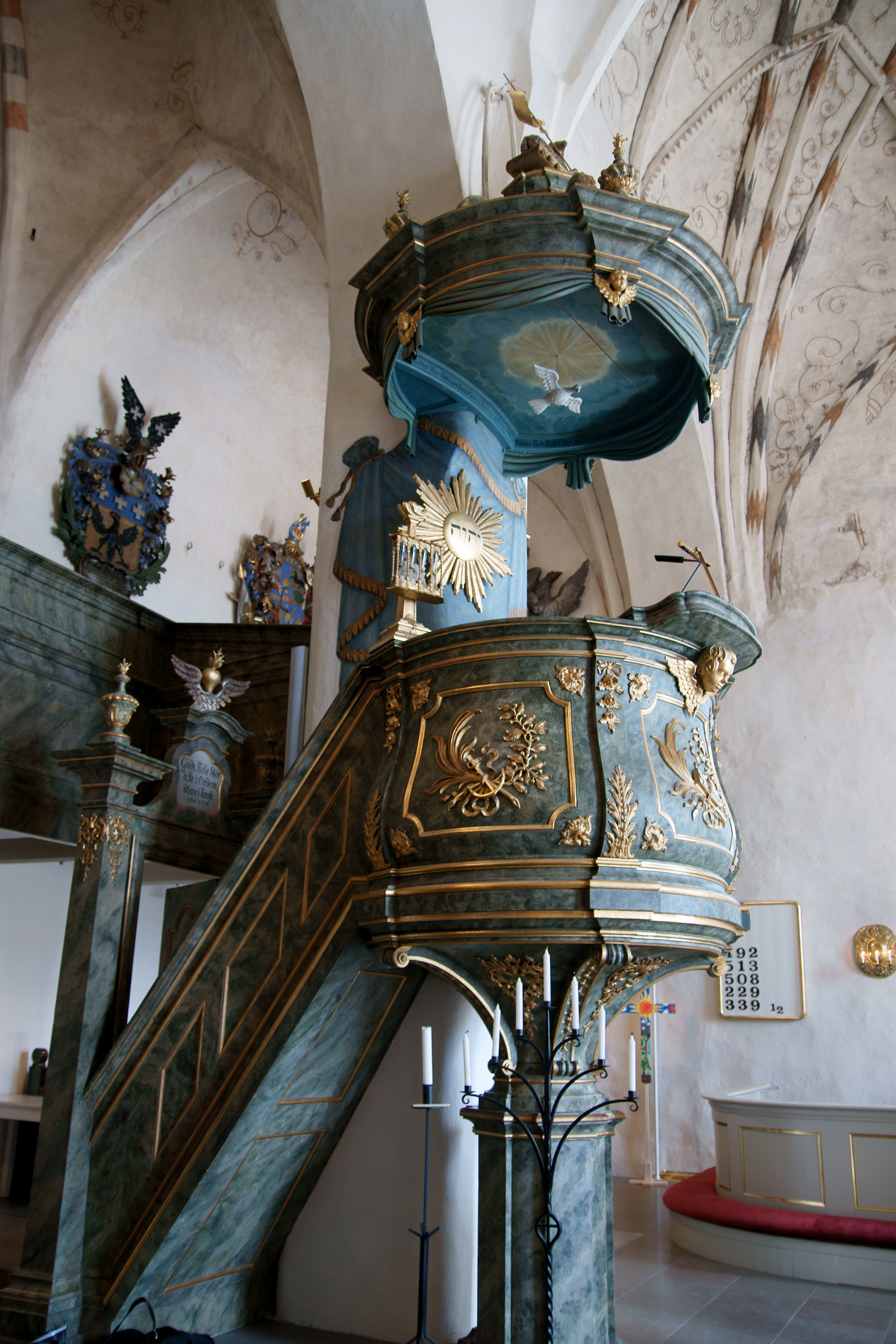
Pulpit at the Porvoo Cathedral in Porvoo, Finland

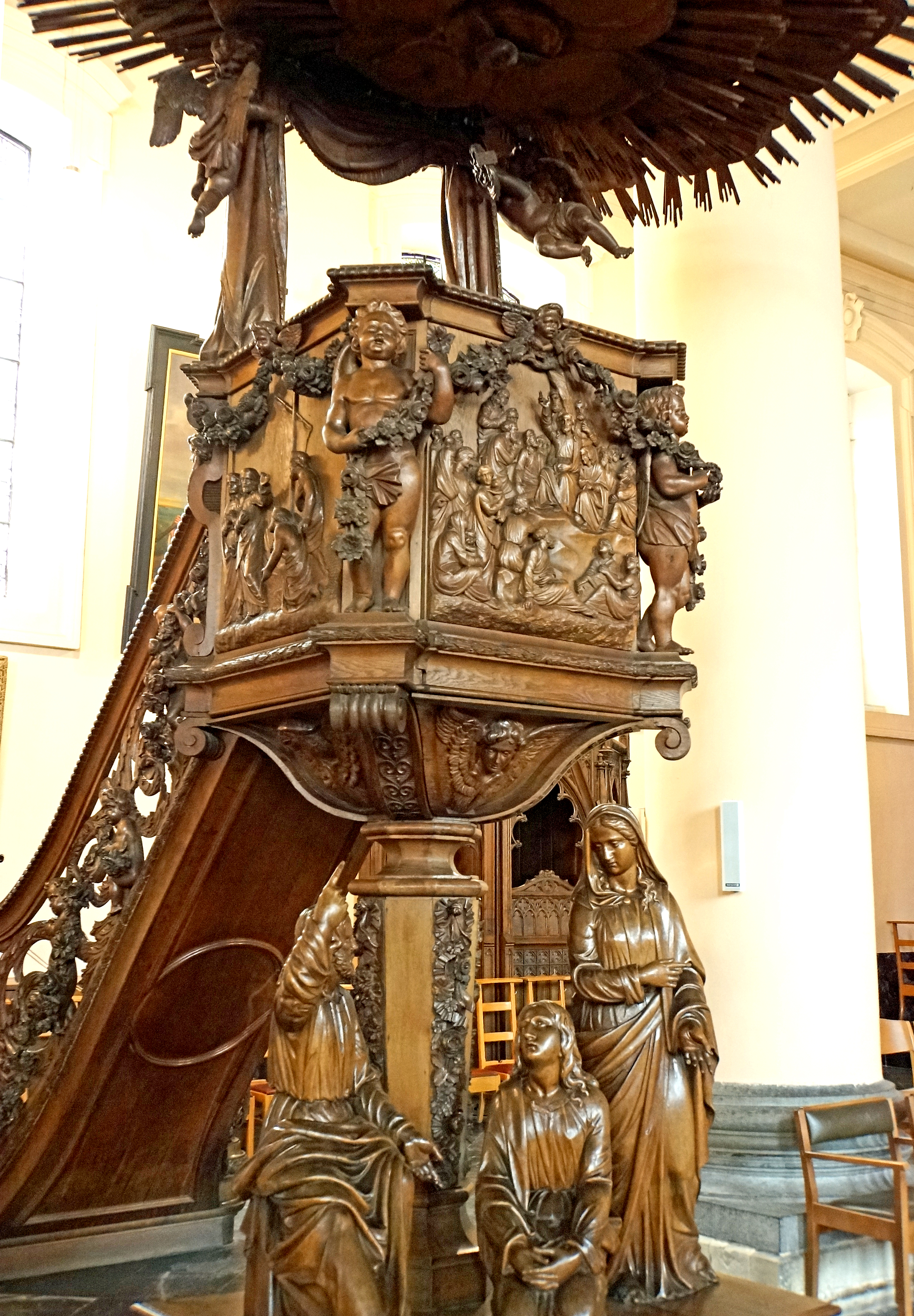
Many of the most elaborate Catholic pulpits are from Baroque Belgium

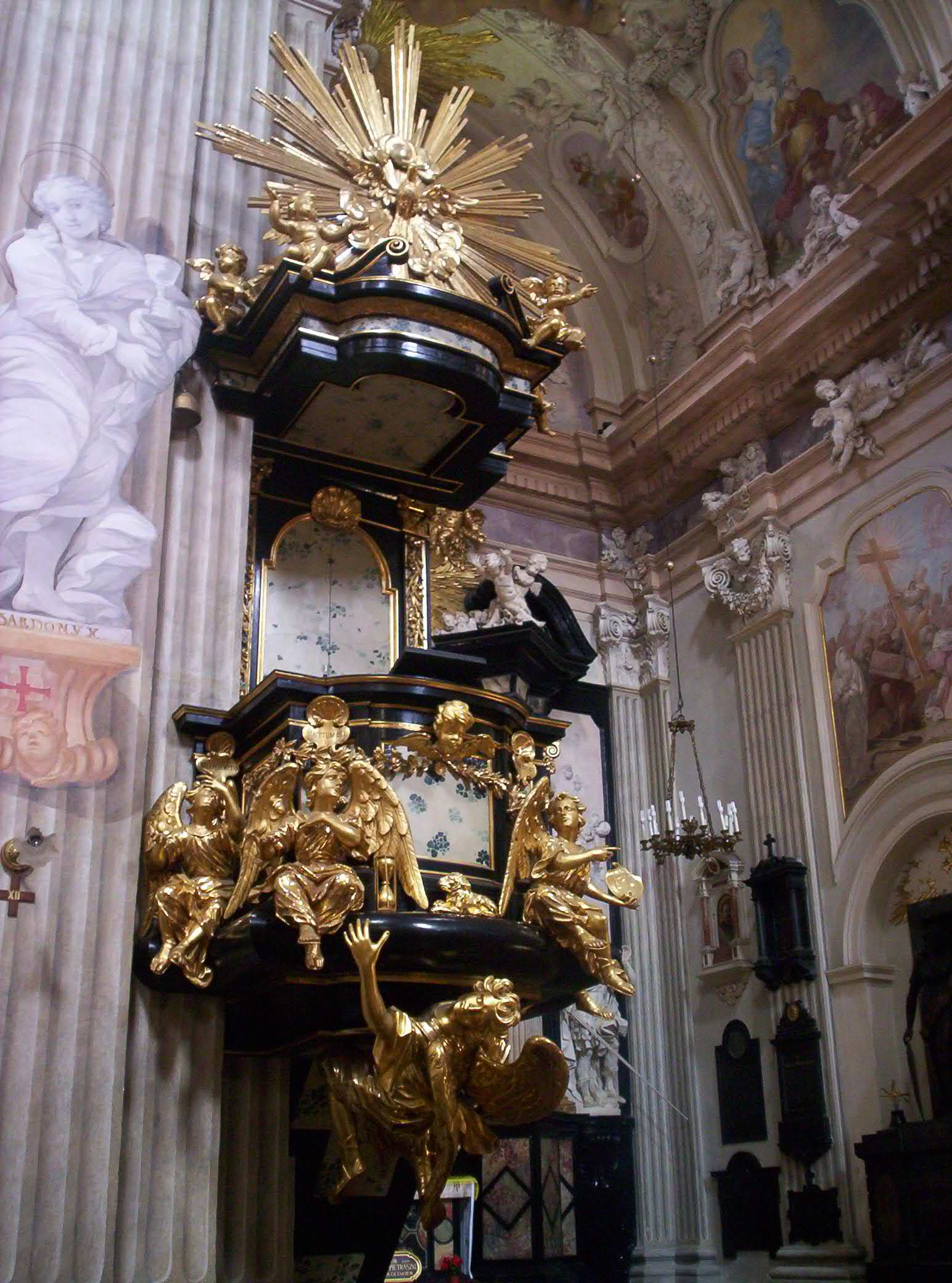
Baroque Church of St. Anne in Kraków, Poland

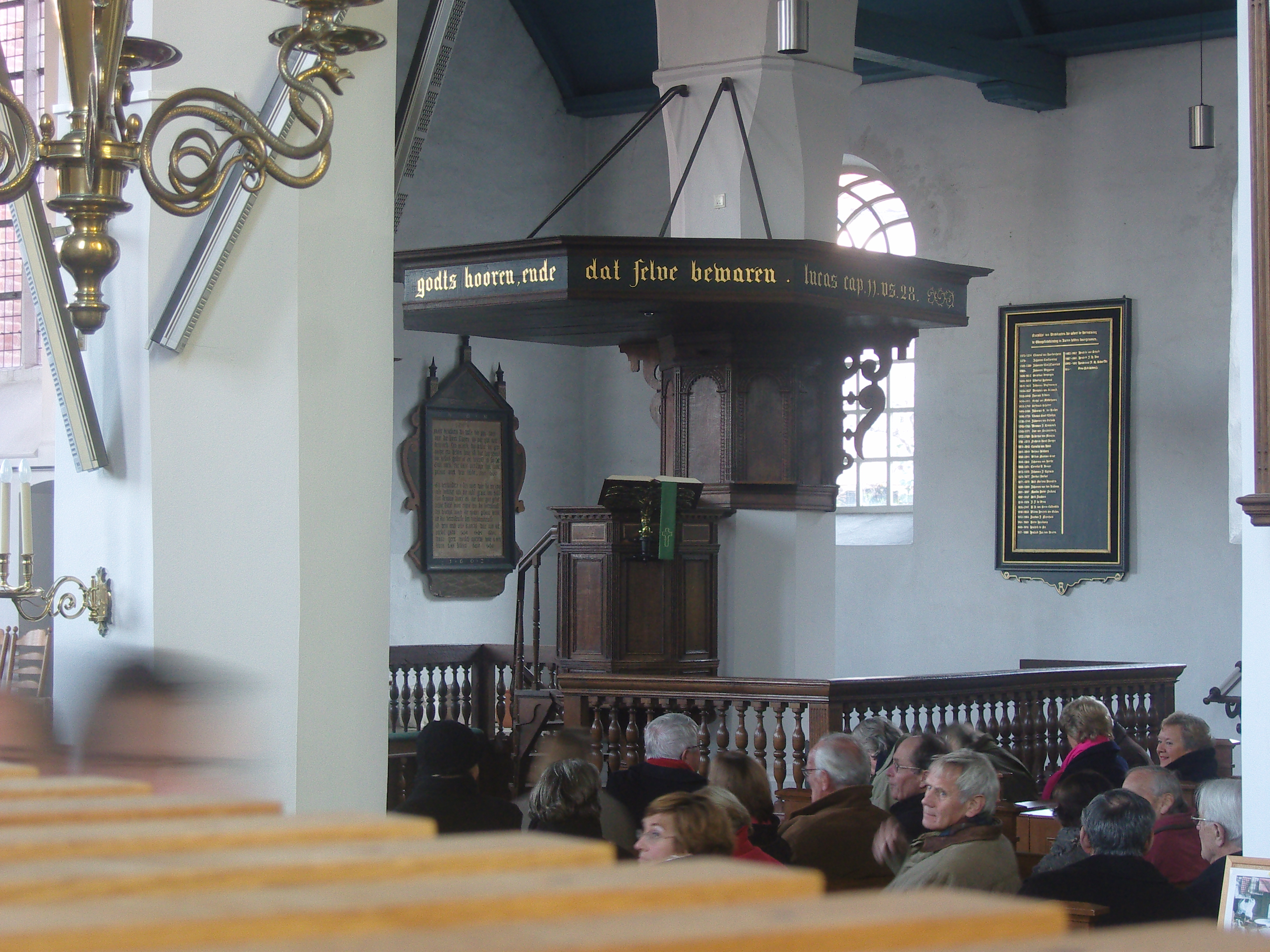
A Calvinist 17th-century pulpit of the Calvinist Dutch Reformed church in Buren, the Netherlands.

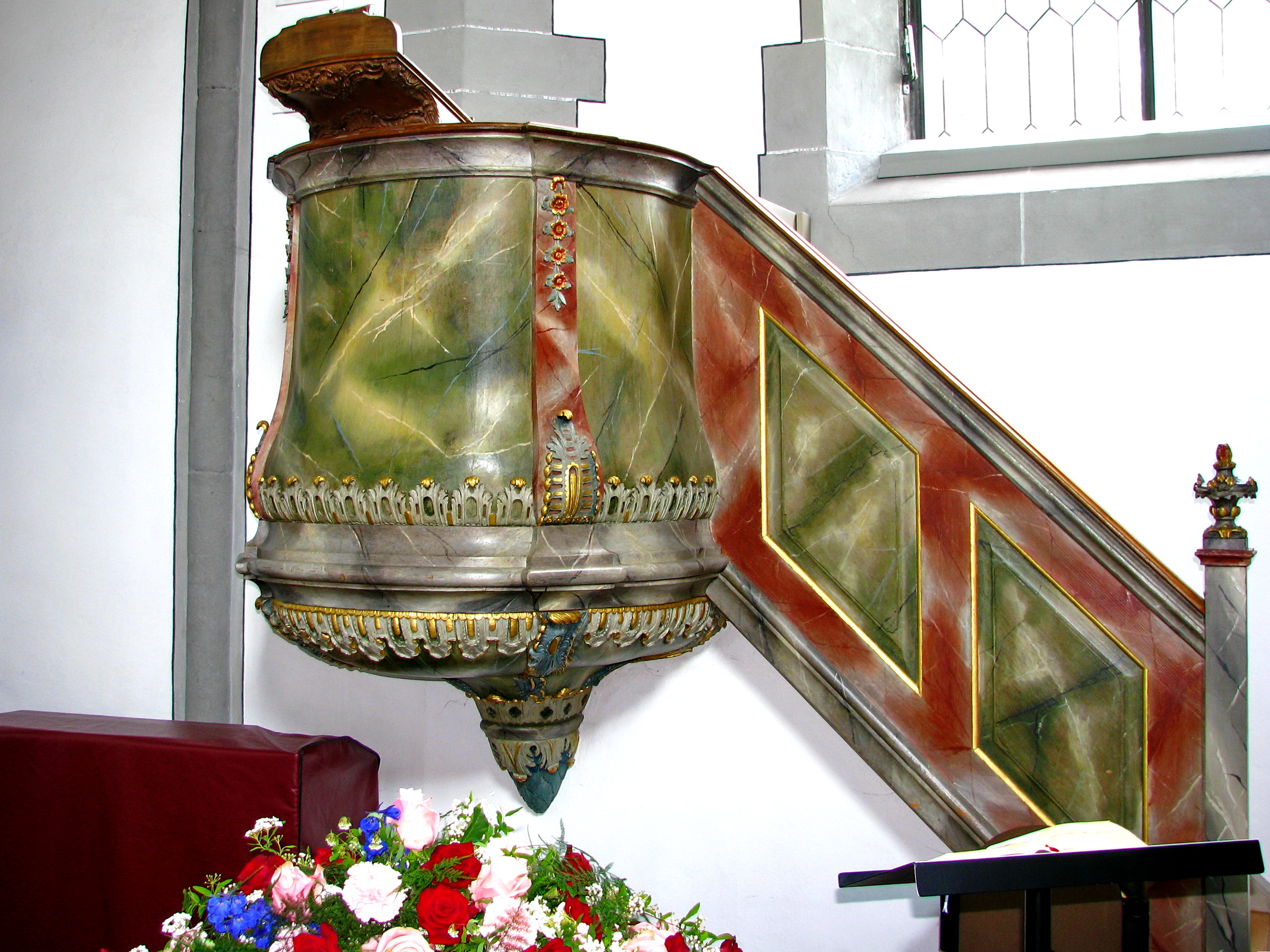
Gallus chapel in Greifensee ZH, Switzerland

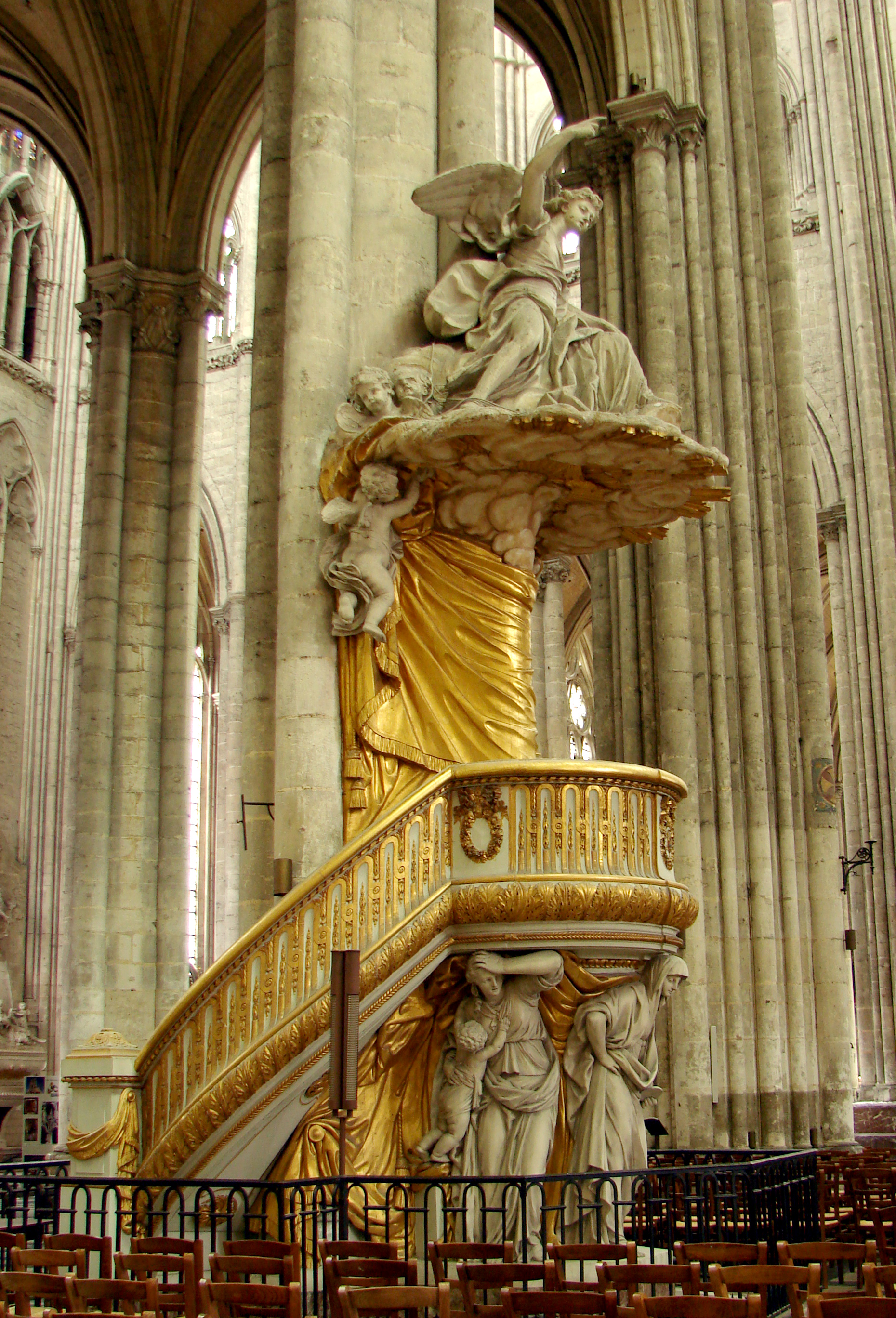
Baroque pulpit in the Amiens Cathedral, France

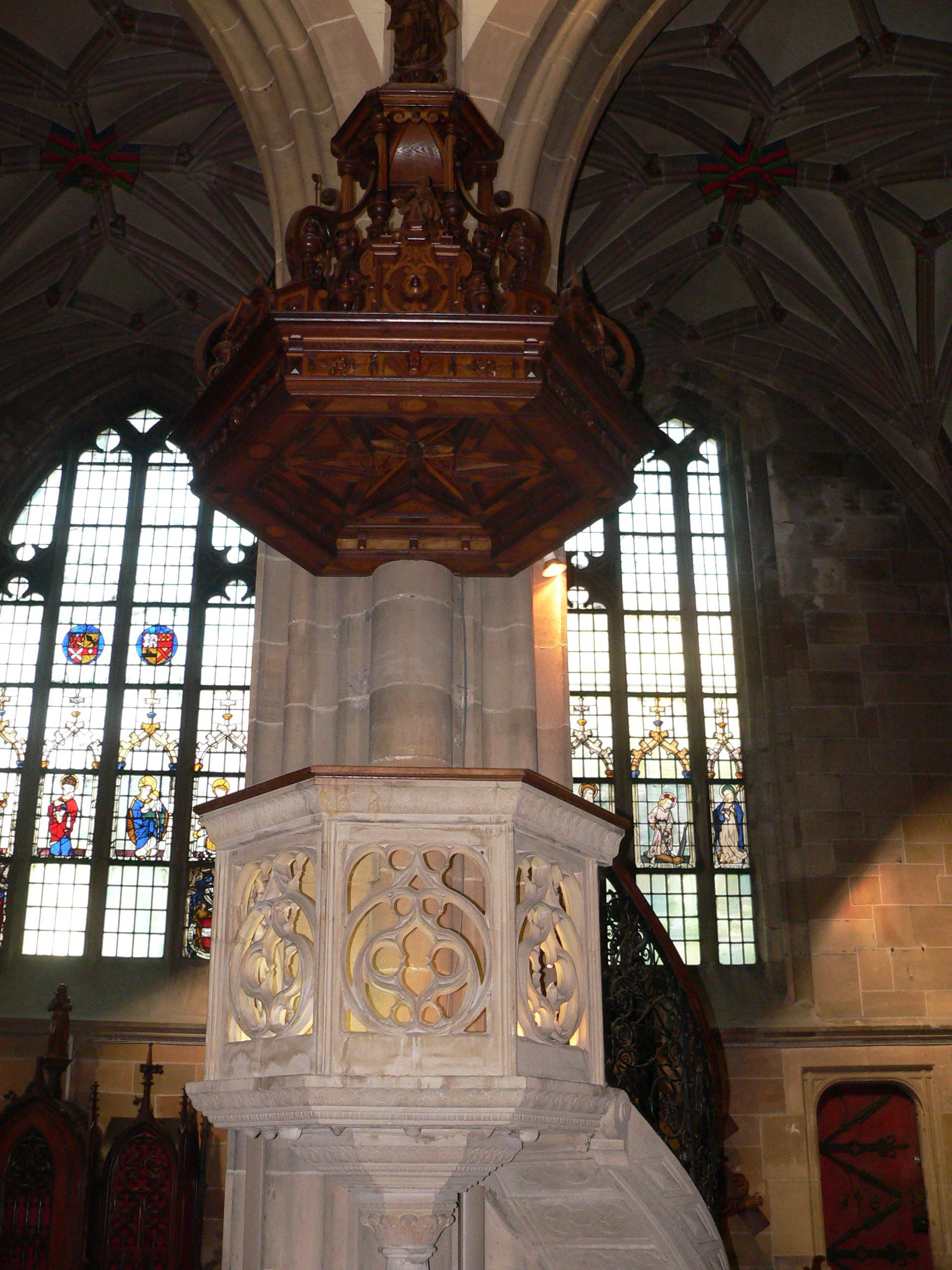
Saint-Thiébaut Church, Thann, France

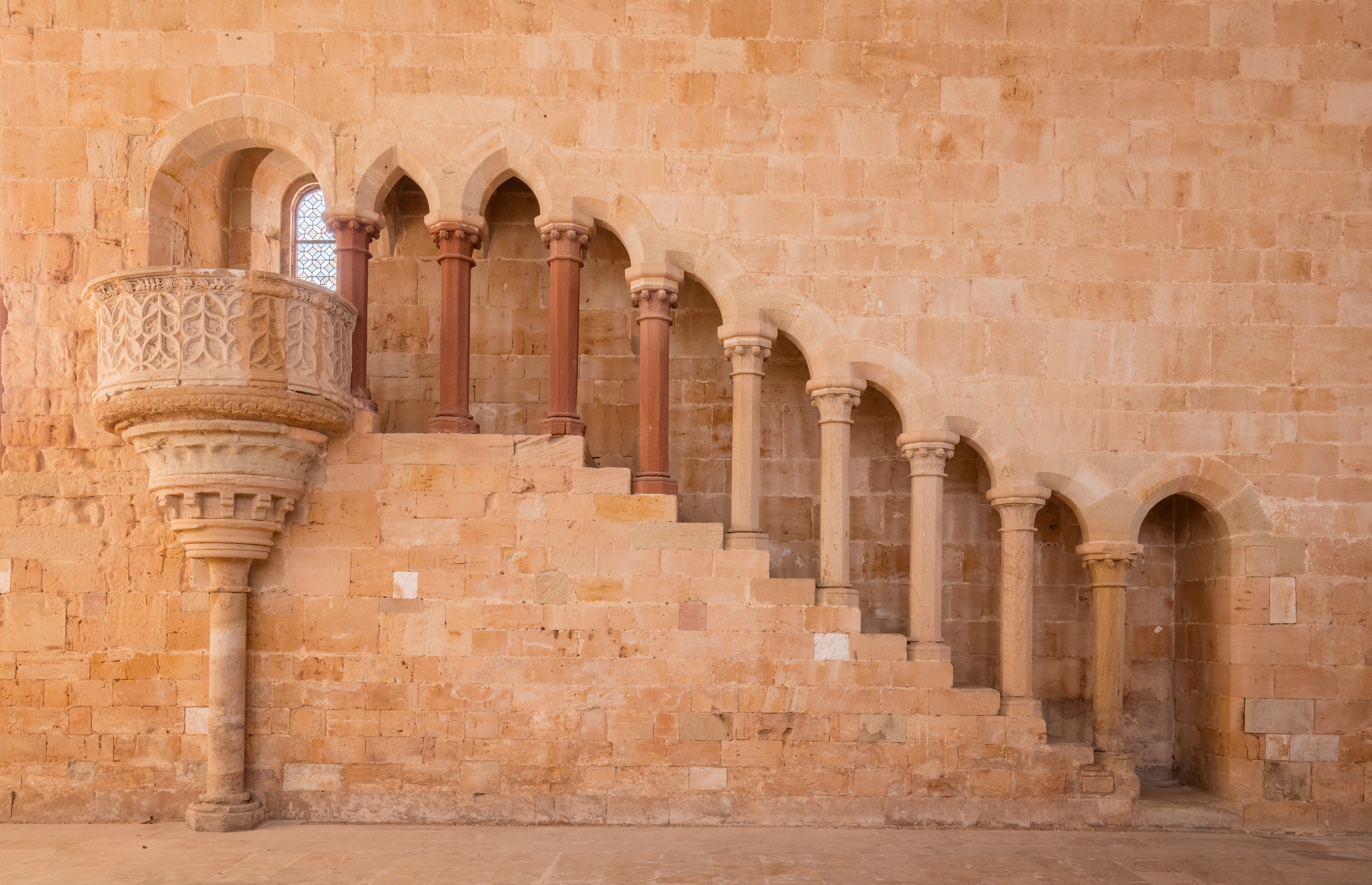
Monastery of Santa María de Huerta, Spain

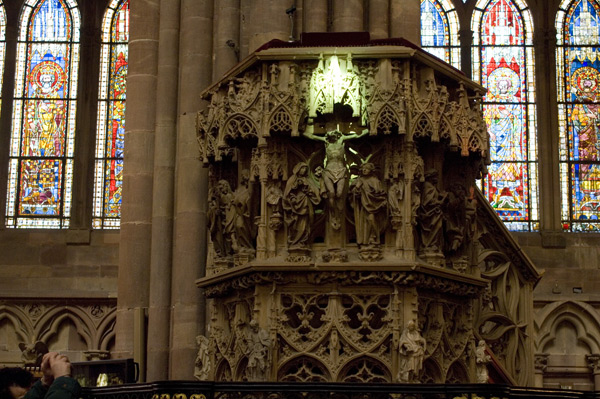
Strasbourg Cathedral, France

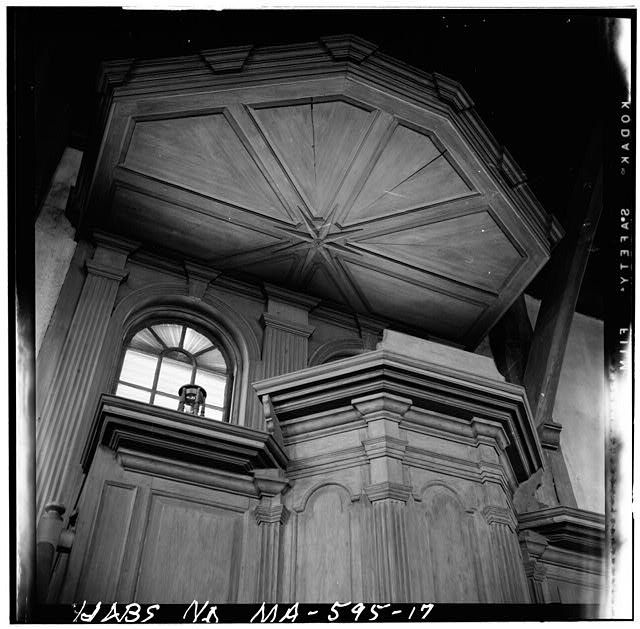
Old Ship Church, Hingham, Massachusetts

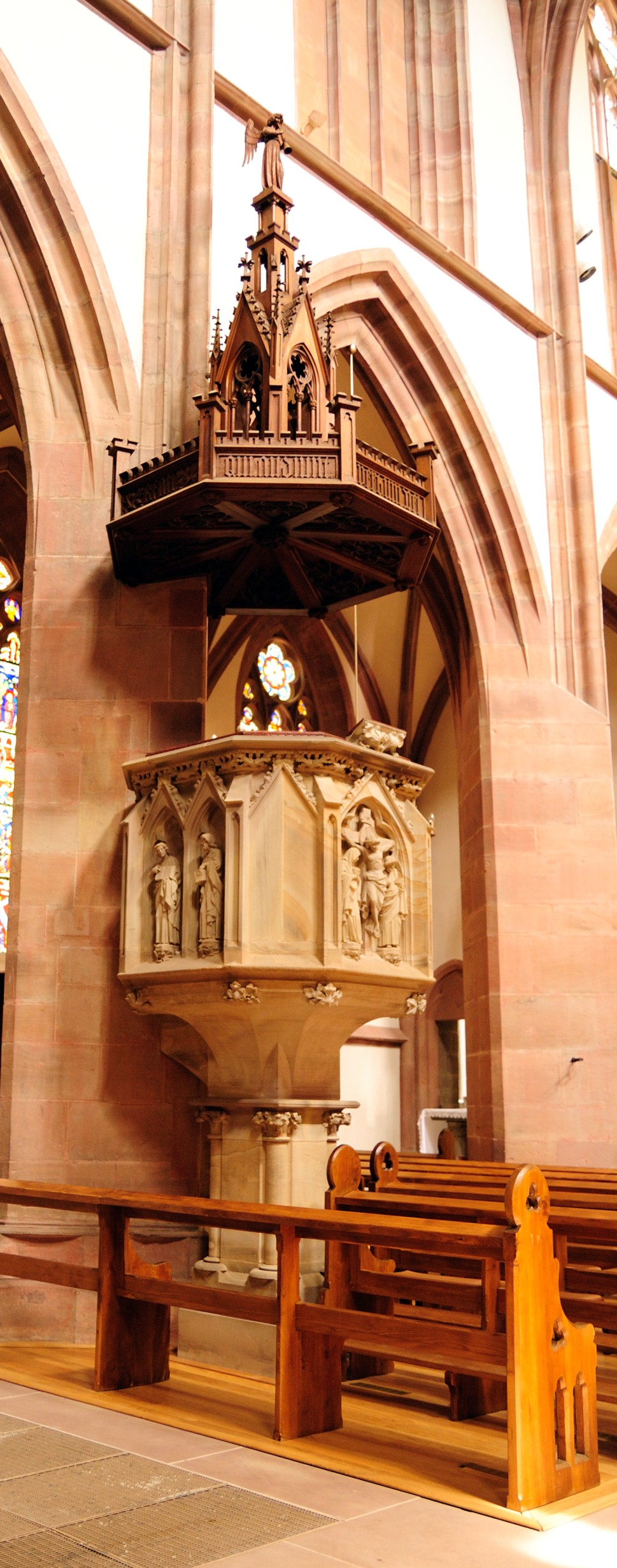
Stone with wooden top in the Collégiale Saint-Florent, Niederhaslach, France

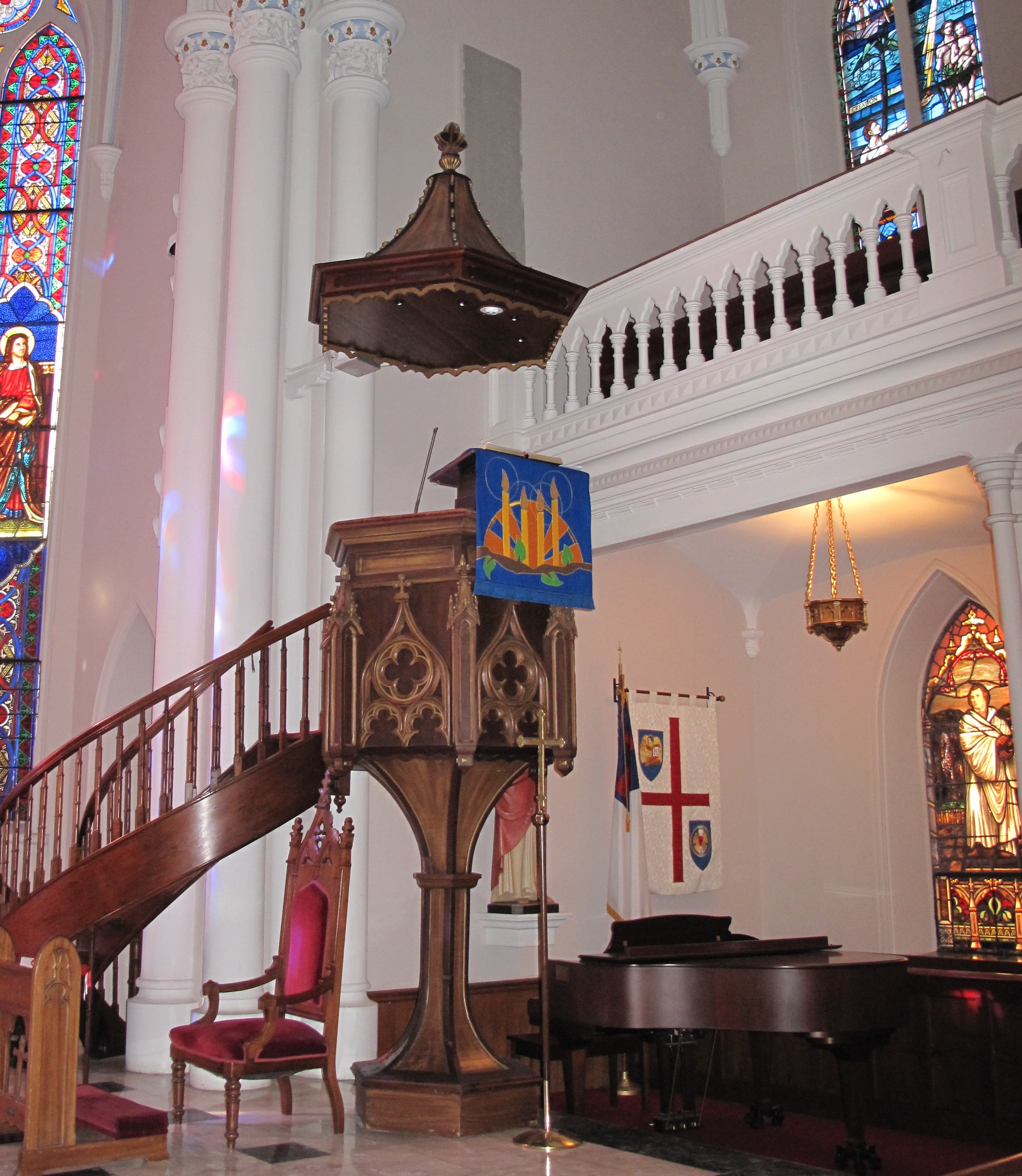
Gothic-revival "wine glass" pulpit and sounding board from 1872 in St. Matthew's German Evangelical Lutheran Church, Charleston, South Carolina

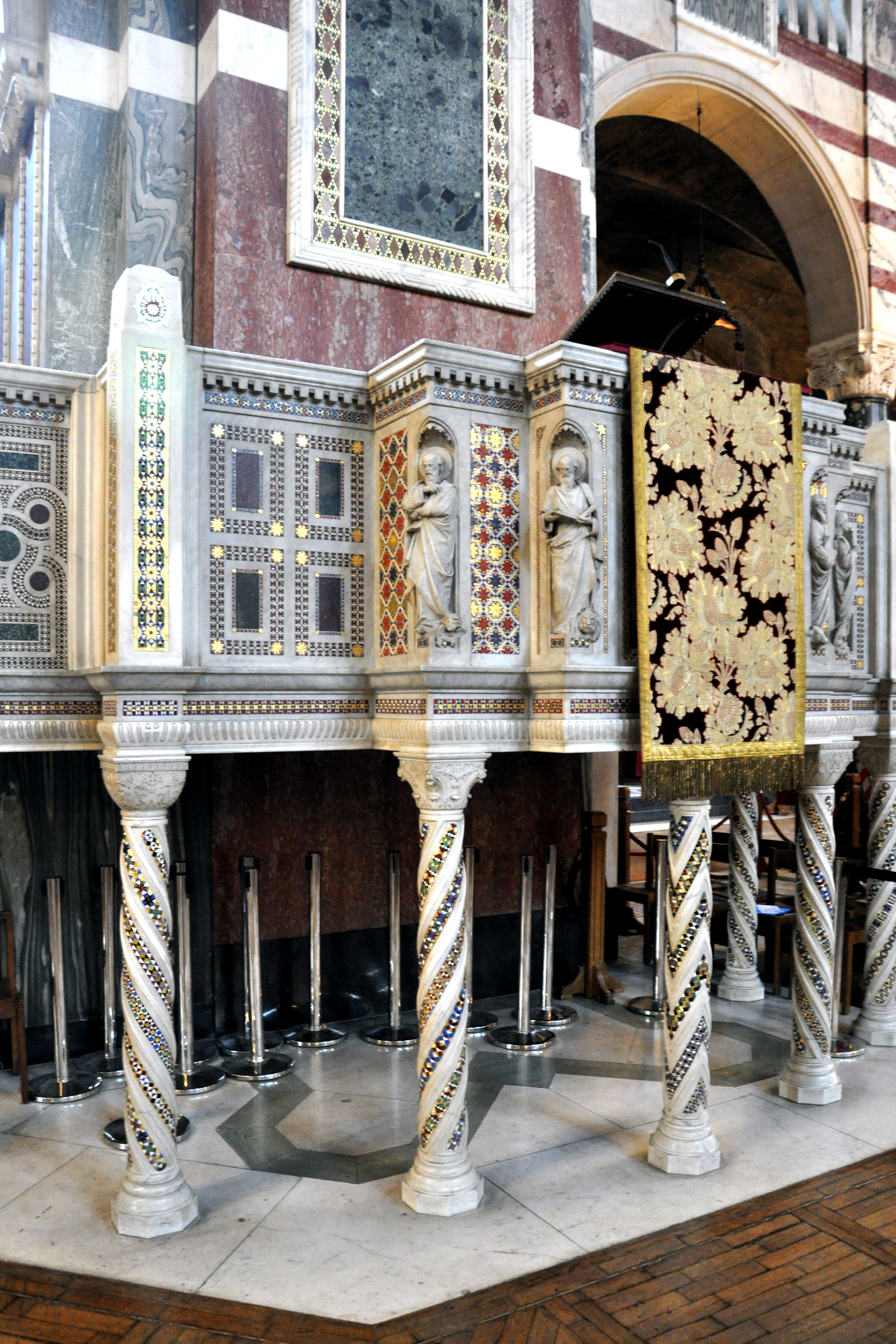
Neo-Byzantine in the Catholic Westminster Cathedral

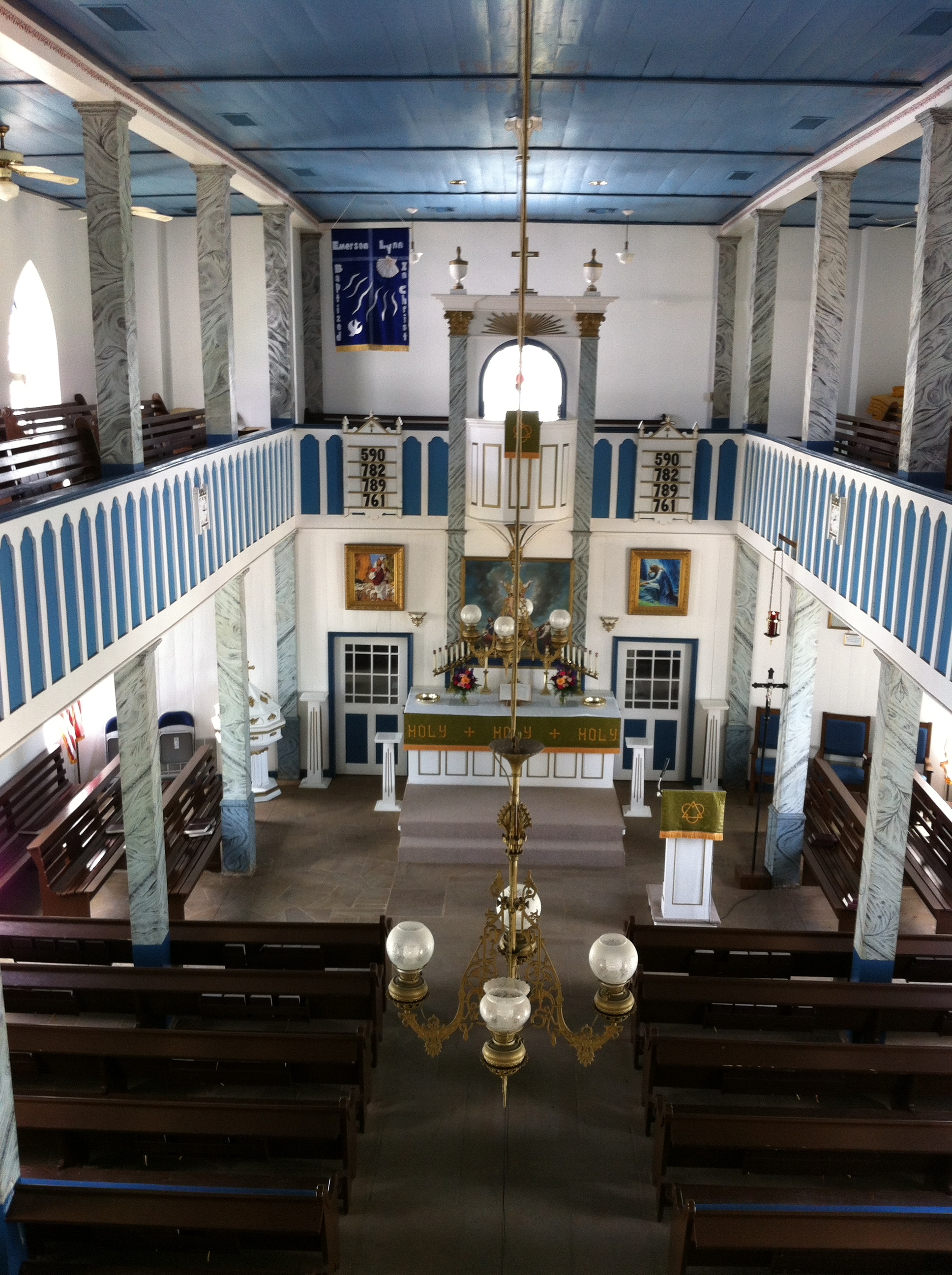
Pulpit altar at balcony level, St. Peter Lutheran, Serbin, Texas

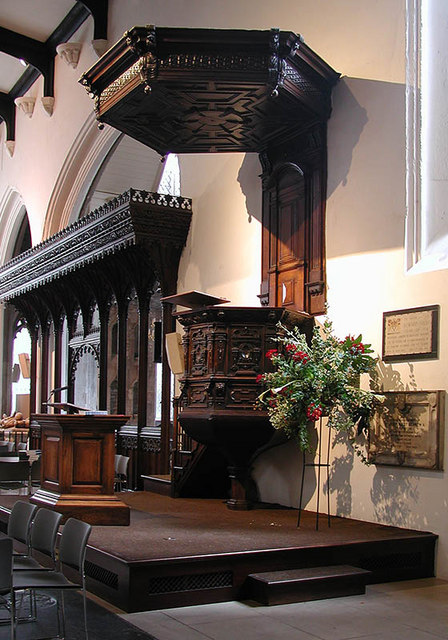
The Jacobean pulpit of St Helen's, Bishopsgate, which is now located perpendicular to the communion table

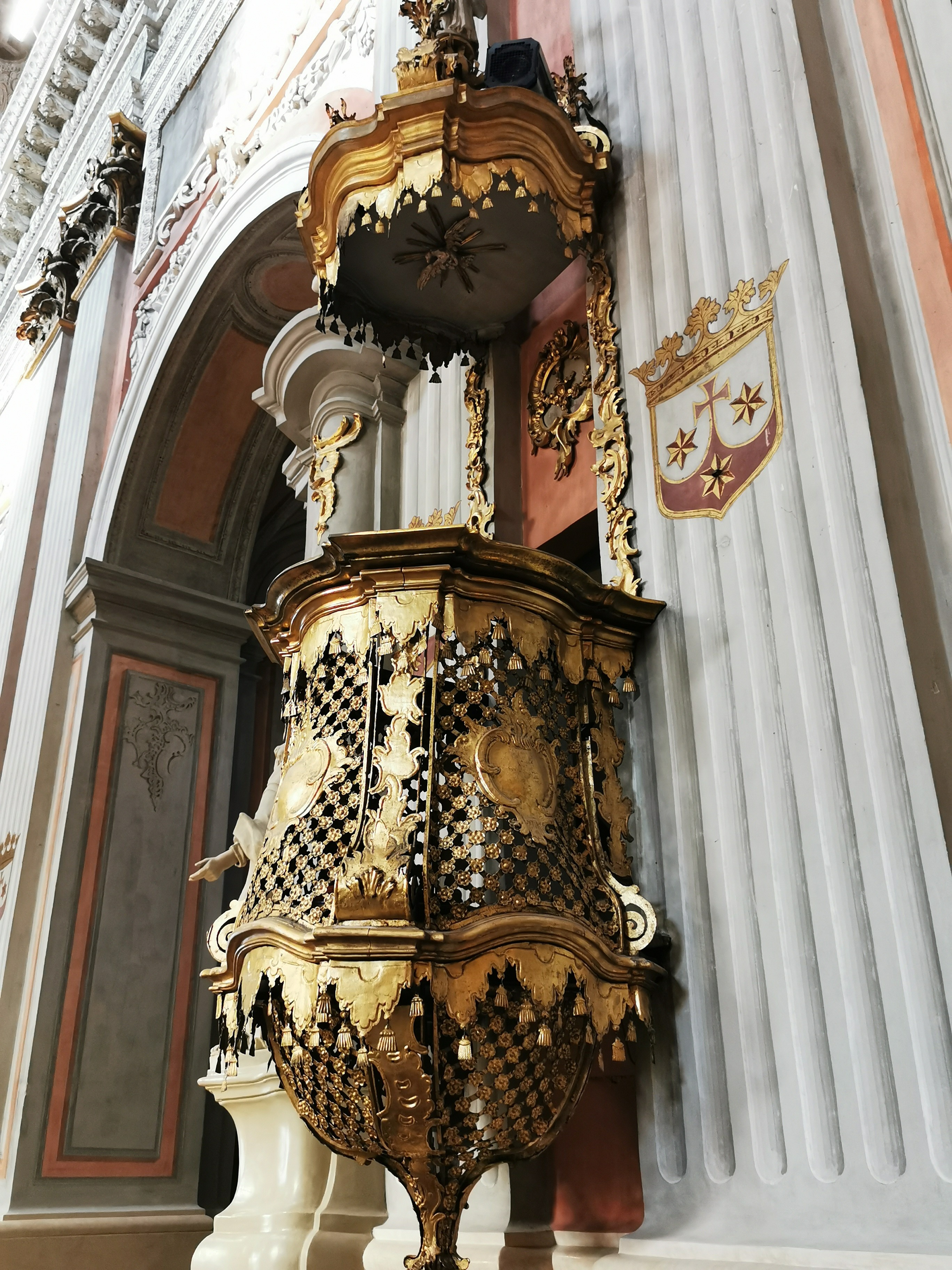
Gilded pulpit of Church of St. Theresa, Vilnius

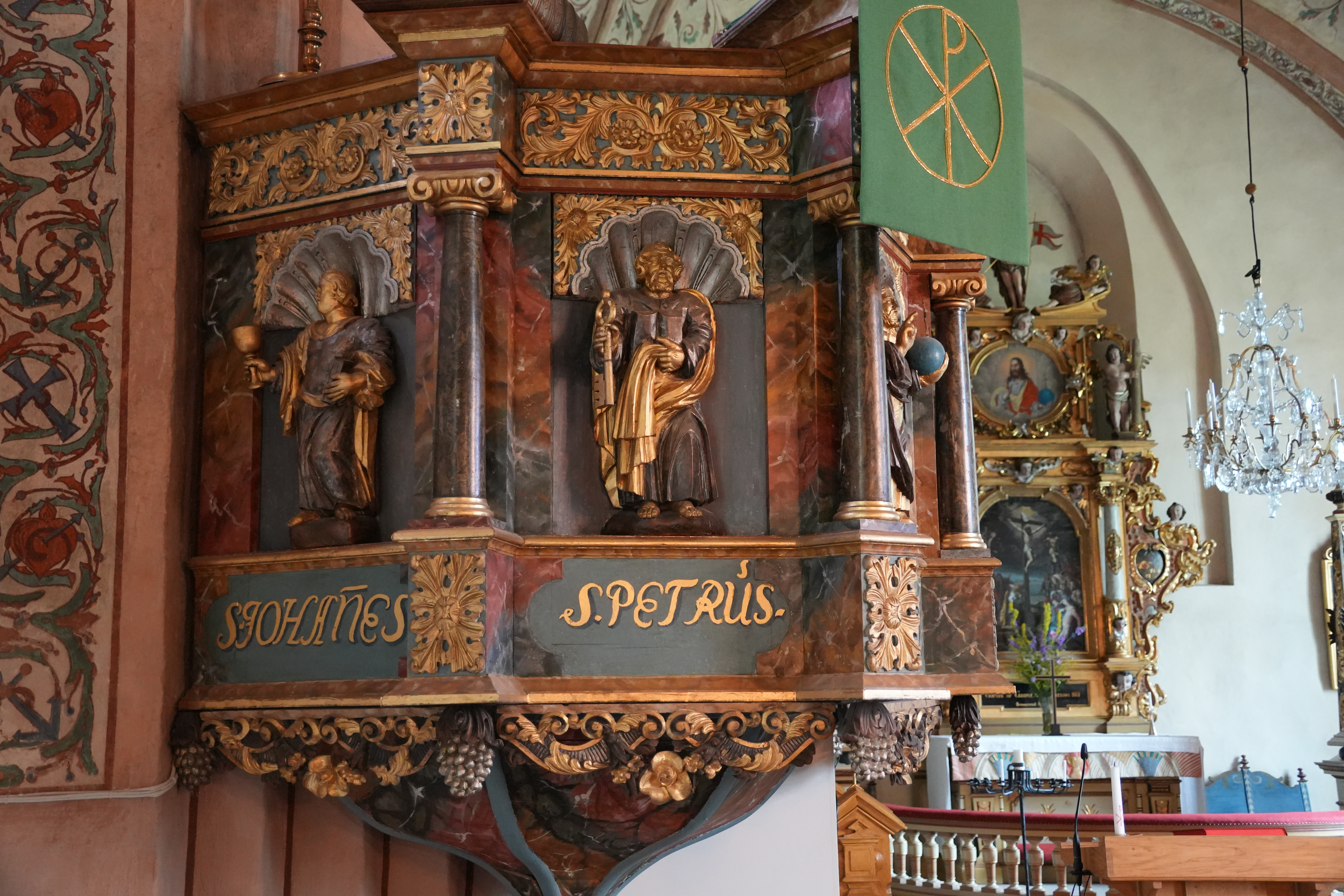
The pulpit of Länna Church (Evangelical-Lutheran) in Norrtälje, Sweden

== See also ==
- Minbar
