= Eagle lectern =

Lectern in an eagle shape

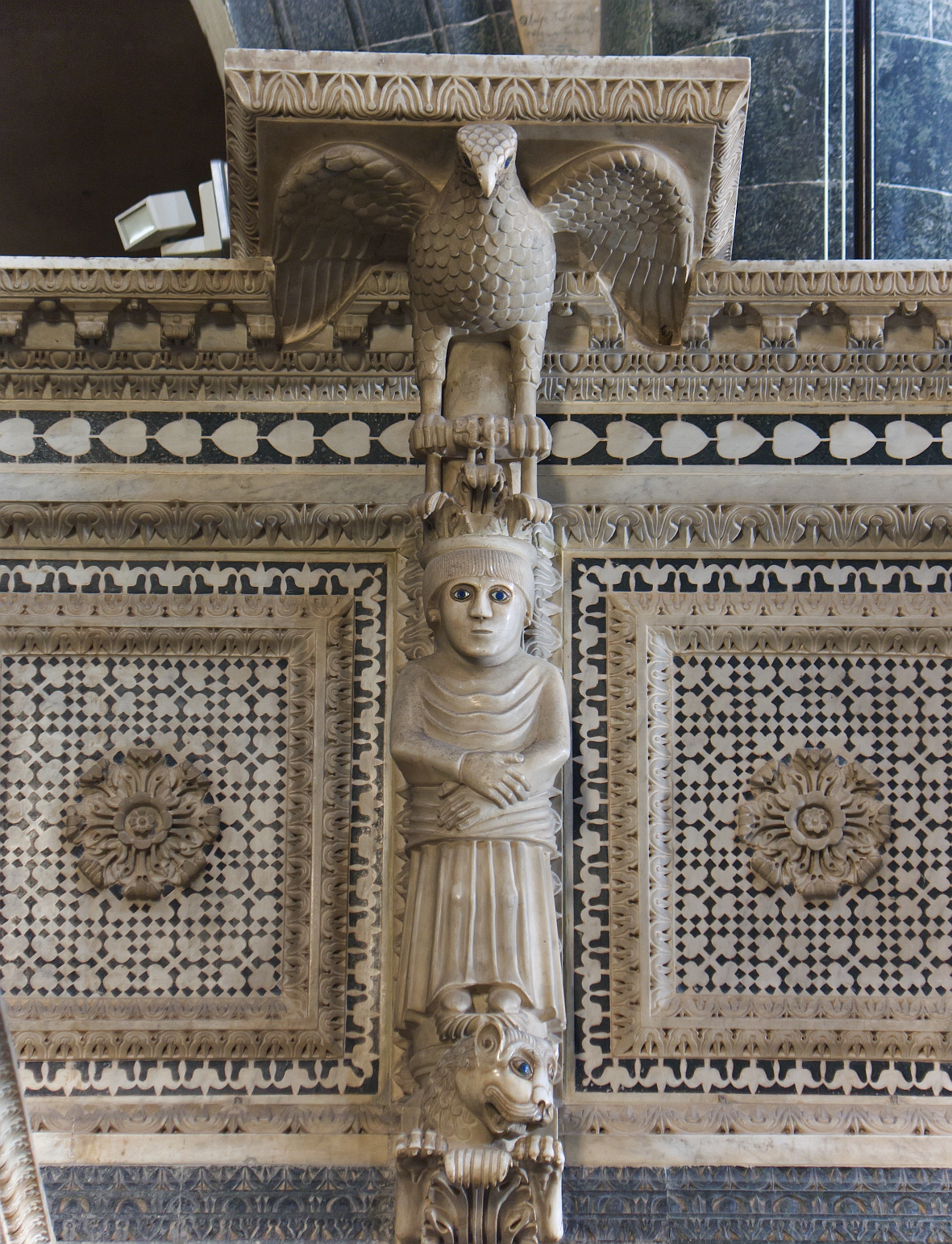
Stone, on the Romanesque pulpit (1207) of San Miniato al Monte, Florence

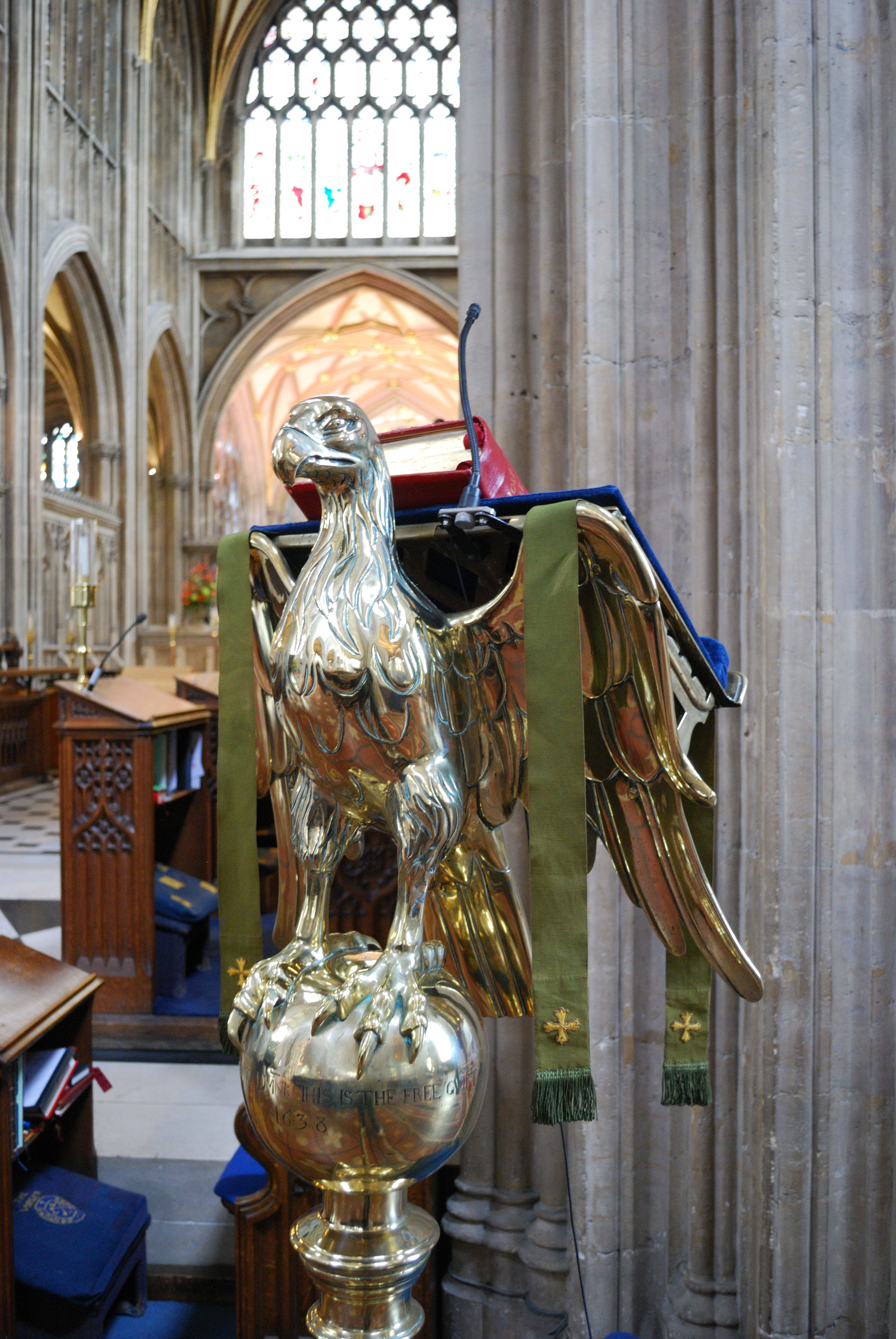
Eagle lectern at St Mary Redcliffe, Bristol, England

An eagle lectern is a lectern in the shape of an eagle on whose outstretched wings the Bible or other texts rest. They are common in Christian churches and may be in stone, wood or metal, usually brass.

== History ==
Eagle lecterns in stone were a well-established feature of large Romanesque pulpits in Italy. The carved marble eagle on the Pulpit in the Pisa Baptistery by Nicola Pisano (1260) is a famous example, and they also feature on his Siena Cathedral Pulpit (1268), and his son's at Sant' Andrea, Pistoia (Giovanni Pisano, 1301). These are projections from the stone ledge or the pulpit, but wood and brass examples usually top a stand that brings them to the appropriate height.

Medieval examples survive in a number of English churches, including the church of St Margaret in King's Lynn and the parish church in Ottery St Mary; they appear to have been often regarded as harmless by the iconoclasts of the English Reformation and English Commonwealth, surviving when most church art was destroyed.

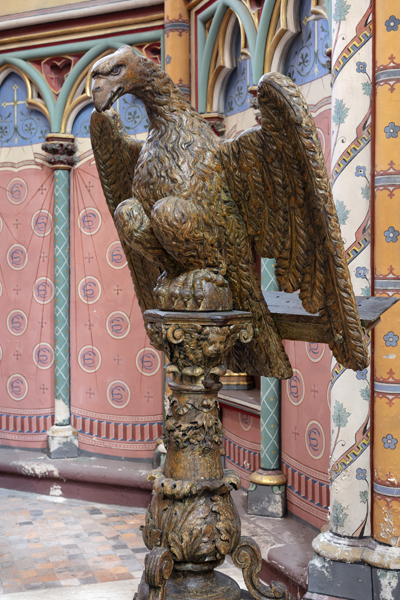
Wood, Orleans Cathedral

In the later Middle Ages, they became a common showpiece for the developing brassworking industry, initially mainly in the Low Countries and in Mosan art, but then spreading elsewhere. The brass Dunkeld Lectern is another notable medieval eagle lectern, initially given to Holyrood Abbey in Scotland, but taken as a trophy to and fro between Scotland and England. Medieval lecterns sometimes depict the eagle grasping a snake in its beak, and sometimes the bird has two heads.

== Symbolism ==
There are several theories regarding the symbolism of the eagle lectern. It is sometimes said to have derived from the belief that the bird was capable of staring into the sun and that Christians similarly were able to gaze unflinchingly at the revelation of the divine word. Alternatively, the eagle was believed to be the bird that flew highest in the sky and was therefore closest to heaven, and symbolised the carrying of the word of God to the four corners of the world. The eagle is also the symbol of John the Apostle, and for this reason may have come to represent the inspiration of the gospels as a whole. Another theory holds that the eagle represents Christ.
