= Pulpit of Sant' Andrea, Pistoia (Giovanni Pisano) =

Pulpit with sculpture by Giovanni Pisano

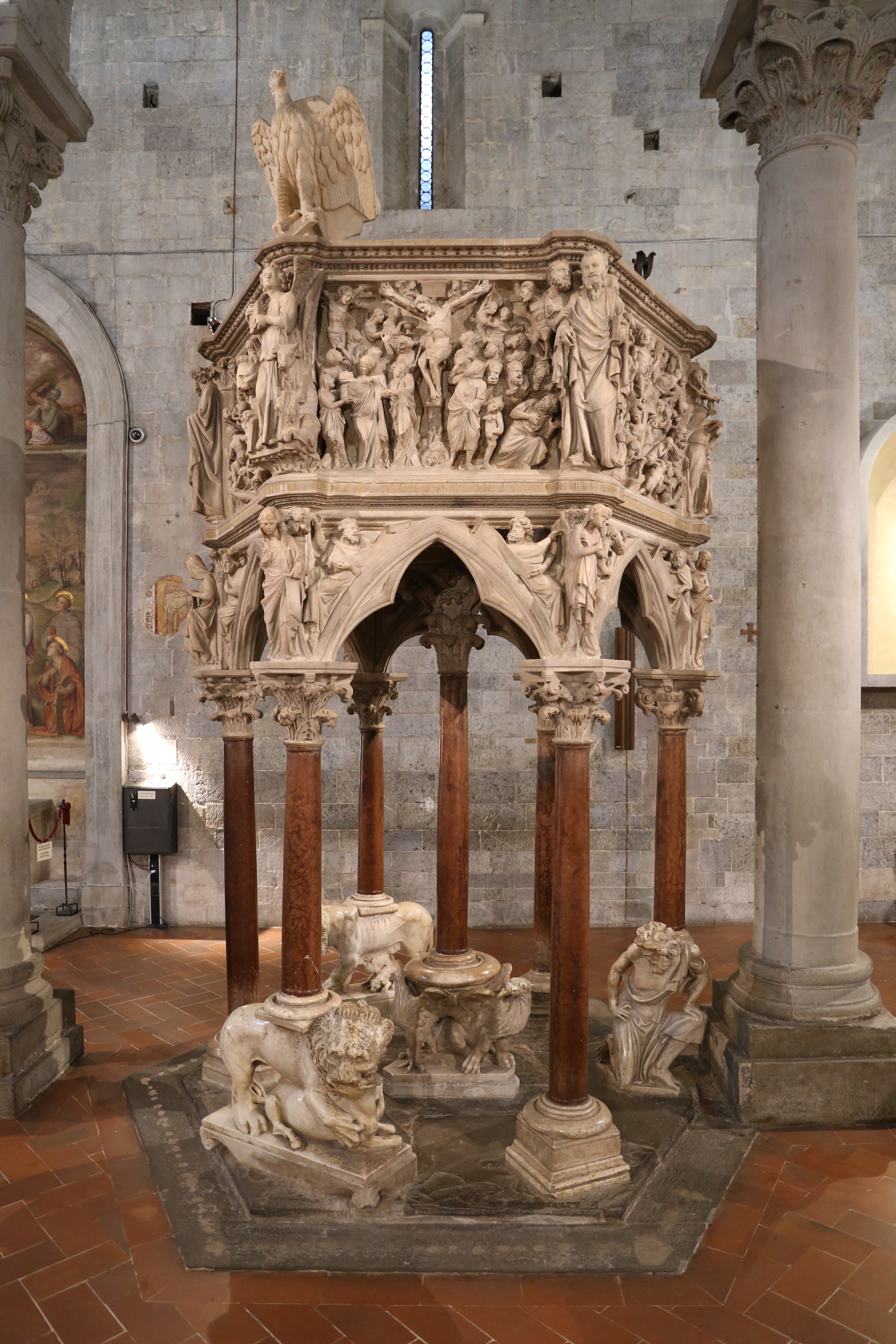
Pulpit of St. Andrew.

The pulpit in the pieve of Sant'Andrea, Pistoia, Italy is a masterpiece by the Italian sculptor Giovanni Pisano, completed in 1301. It has many similarities with the groundbreaking pulpit in the Pisa Baptistery of 1260 by Giovanni's father Nicola Pisano, which was followed by the Siena Cathedral Pulpit (1268), which Giovanni had assisted with.

These very advanced works are often described in terms such as "proto-Renaissance", and draw on Ancient Roman sarcophagi and other influences to form a style that represents an early revival of classical sculpture, while also remaining Gothic, and drawing on sources such as French ivory carvings. However, Giovanni's style moved away from the strong classicism of his father's style to one more influenced by northern Gothic art.

== History ==
According to an inscription running on the cornice between the pulpit's pointed arches and parapets, it was commissioned by Canon Arnoldus (Arnoldo) and supervised by the treasurers Andrea Vitelli and Tino di Vitale. Vasari says the commission was given in 1297, and the inscription records its completion in 1301. There is no false modesty: "Giovanni carved it, who performed no empty work. The son of Nicola, and blessed with higher skill, Pisa gave him birth, endowed with mastery greater than any seen before".

Giovanni was approaching the age of fifty when he began the work, and had worked on his father's projects, and possibly visited France.

== Description ==
The structure is similar to the pulpit in Pisa: a hexagonal plan with seven porphyry columns (one in the middle), two of which are supported by lions, one with a deer in its claws, the other a lioness with her suckling cup and a leveret at her feet. A third is supported by a stooping figure of Atlas, while the central column rests on three winged creatures, an eagle, a griffin and a lion. The remaining three stand on plain bases. The capitals of the columns are inventive derivations of the Corinthian order. The organization of the parapet's reliefs is inspired by the pulpit in Siena.

The iconographic program is also inspired by Nicola's work, with allegorical sculptures in the pendentives of the arches, Sibyls and Prophets standing on the capitals' tops, and the five parapets with the following scenes from the Life of Christ:

- "Annunciation", "Nativity" with the apocryphal detail of the midwives bathing the baby Christ and an "Annunciation to the Shepherds"
- "Dream of the Magi", "Adoration of the Magi", and "Dream of Joseph"
- "Massacre of the Innocents"
- "The Crucifixion"
- "Last Judgement"

The sixth parapet is missing, as its side provides access to the pulpit; the original stairway has now been removed. On the corner between the reliefs of the Massacre of the Innocents and The Crucifixion, an eagle lectern rises above the parapet. Beneath the symbol of John the Evangelist, the other three Evangelists are represented by their symbols as well: the lion for Saint Mark, in the middle the angel (or winged man) for Saint Matthew, and Saint Luke's ox on the right.

== Style ==
The scenes of the reliefs are as crowded and dramatic as those of the Sienese pulpit. Most notable is the scene of the "Massacre of the Innocents", for which it has been supposed that Giovanni took inspiration from German models, or even from the Trajan column in Rome. One of the Sibyls, portrayed in a sudden turn disconcerted by the inspiration of an angel, is also of particular distinction. For the first time Giovanni tilted the reliefs, with the upper parts projecting further than the lower, to allow for the position of the viewer below.

=== The relief of the Three Magi ===
The only relief deviating from the extremely congested compositions of the dramatic action is the panel of the Three Magi. Instead of the figures protruding in several strata from the background, the lying figures of the dreaming Magi on the left and Joseph on the bottom right are voluminous and take their space, without showing off at least some elaborated drapery. The relief as a whole, which depicts nevertheless three independent scenes, is less dense populated and more airy than any other of the panels on the pulpit. There are more patches of plain background left open, which originally was equipped with tesserae. Another techniqual observation is the use of a running drill for contours around the bodies and on their surface. This, the massive bodies of the figure, their simplified drapery and the more spacious design of the relief led Gerd Kreytenberg to propose the collaboration of Tino di Camaino, a then about 20-year old member in the workshop of Giovanni. Tino had learned his skills in Siena, where he took up the specific use of the drill, which Giovanni never did.

Details of the pulpit

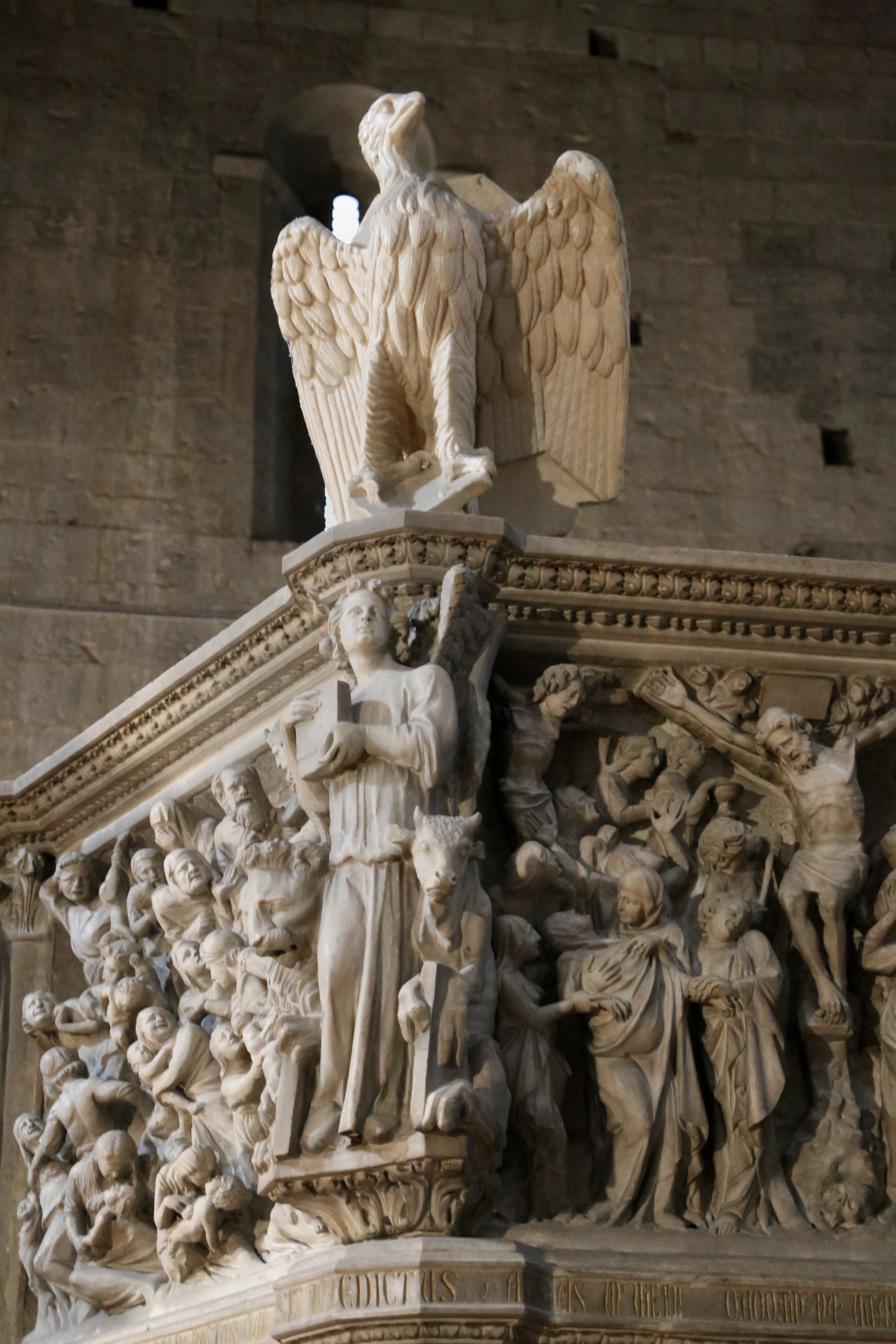
The eagle of Saint John above the other three Symbols of the Evangelists

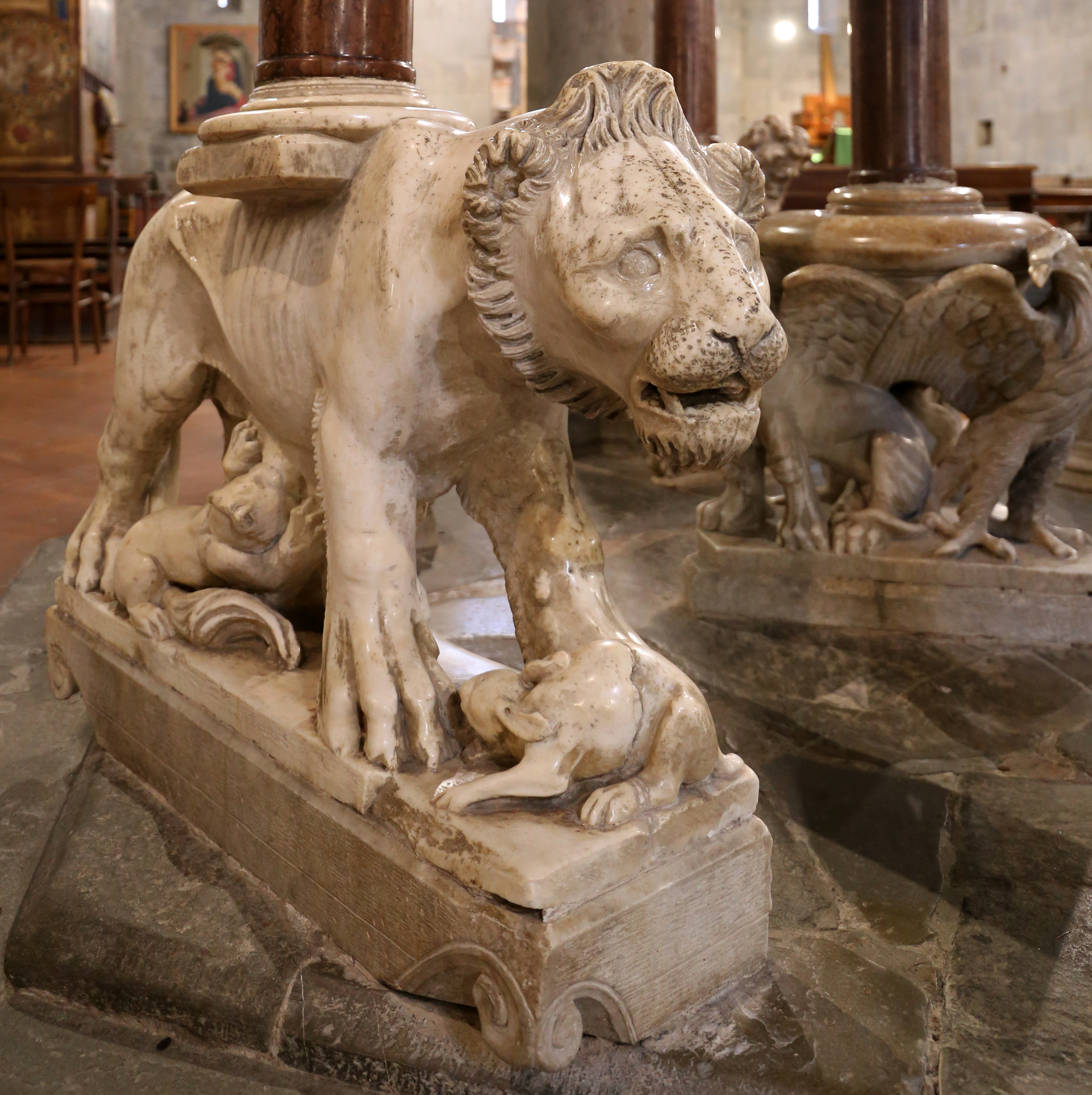
Lioness with cup and leveret

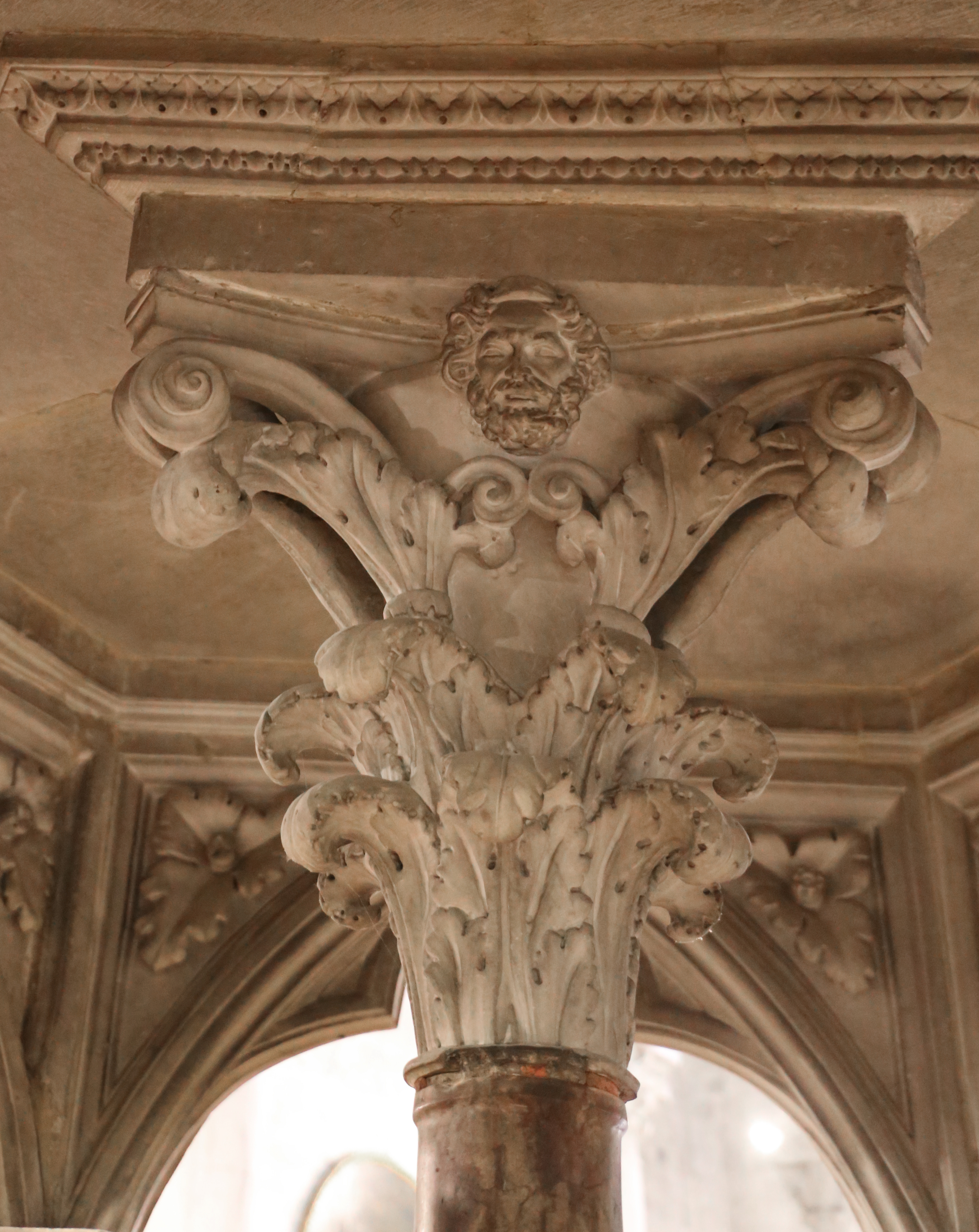
Three-sided capital of the central column

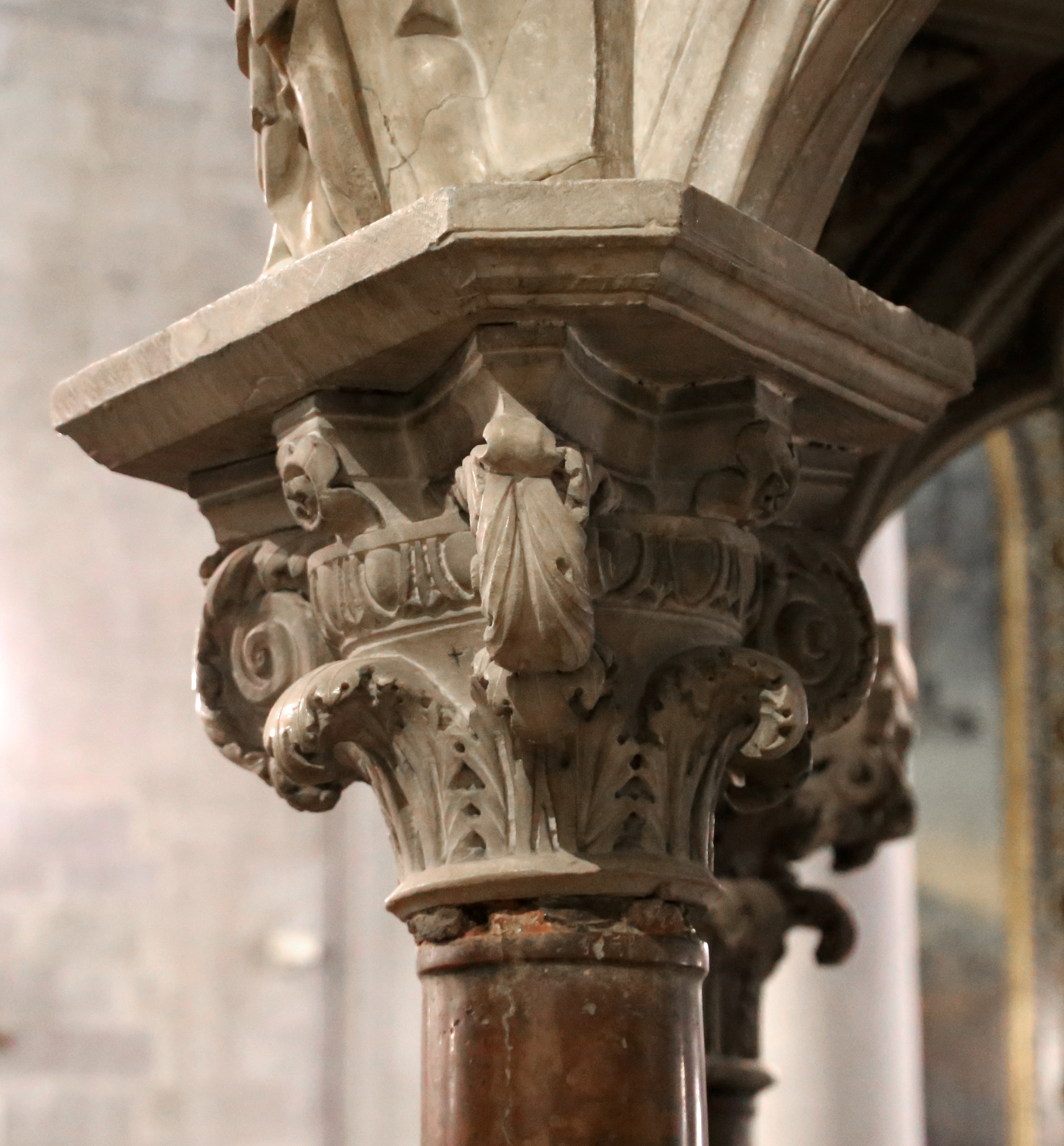
Capital of an outer support

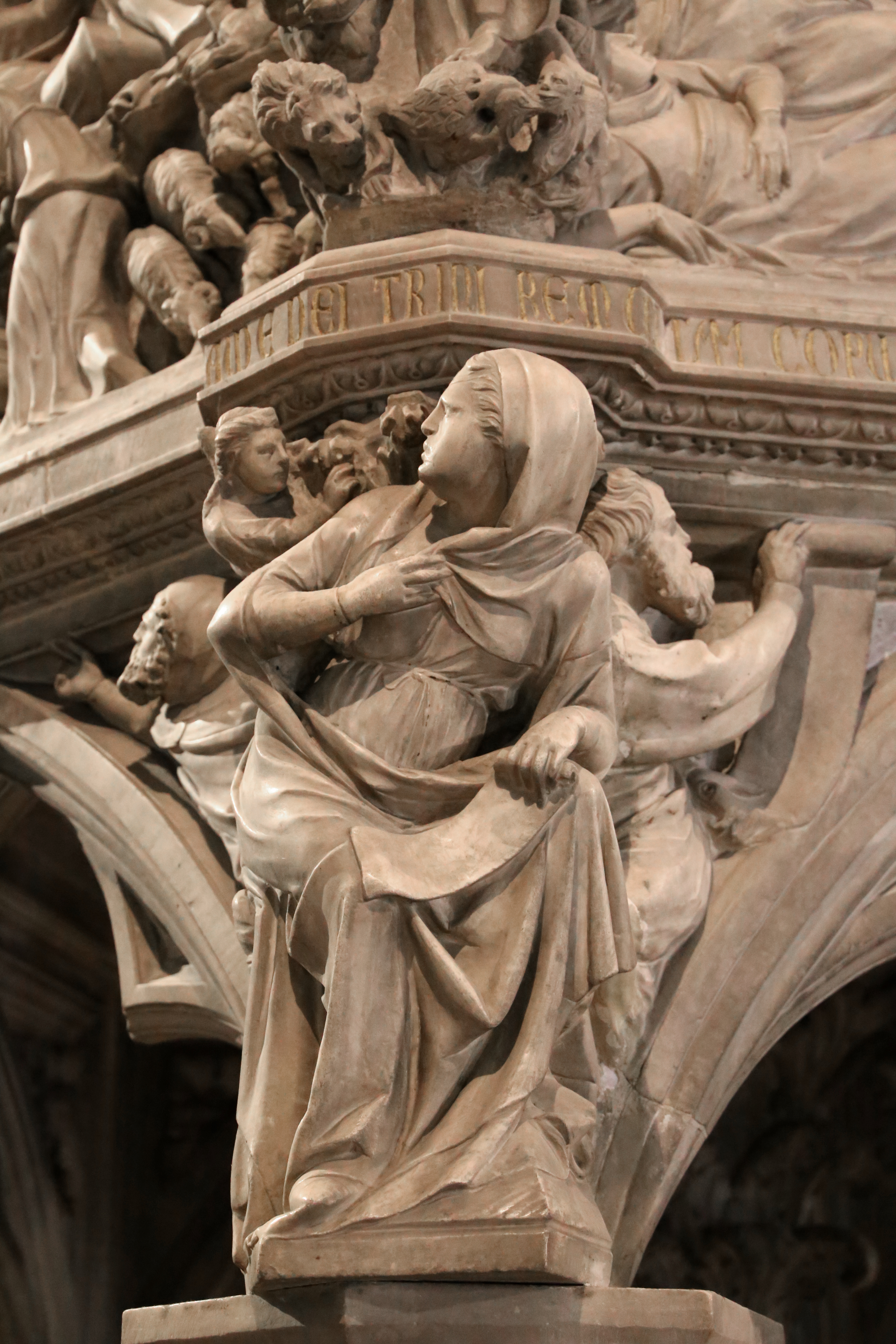
Sybil and inspiring Angel
The reliefs

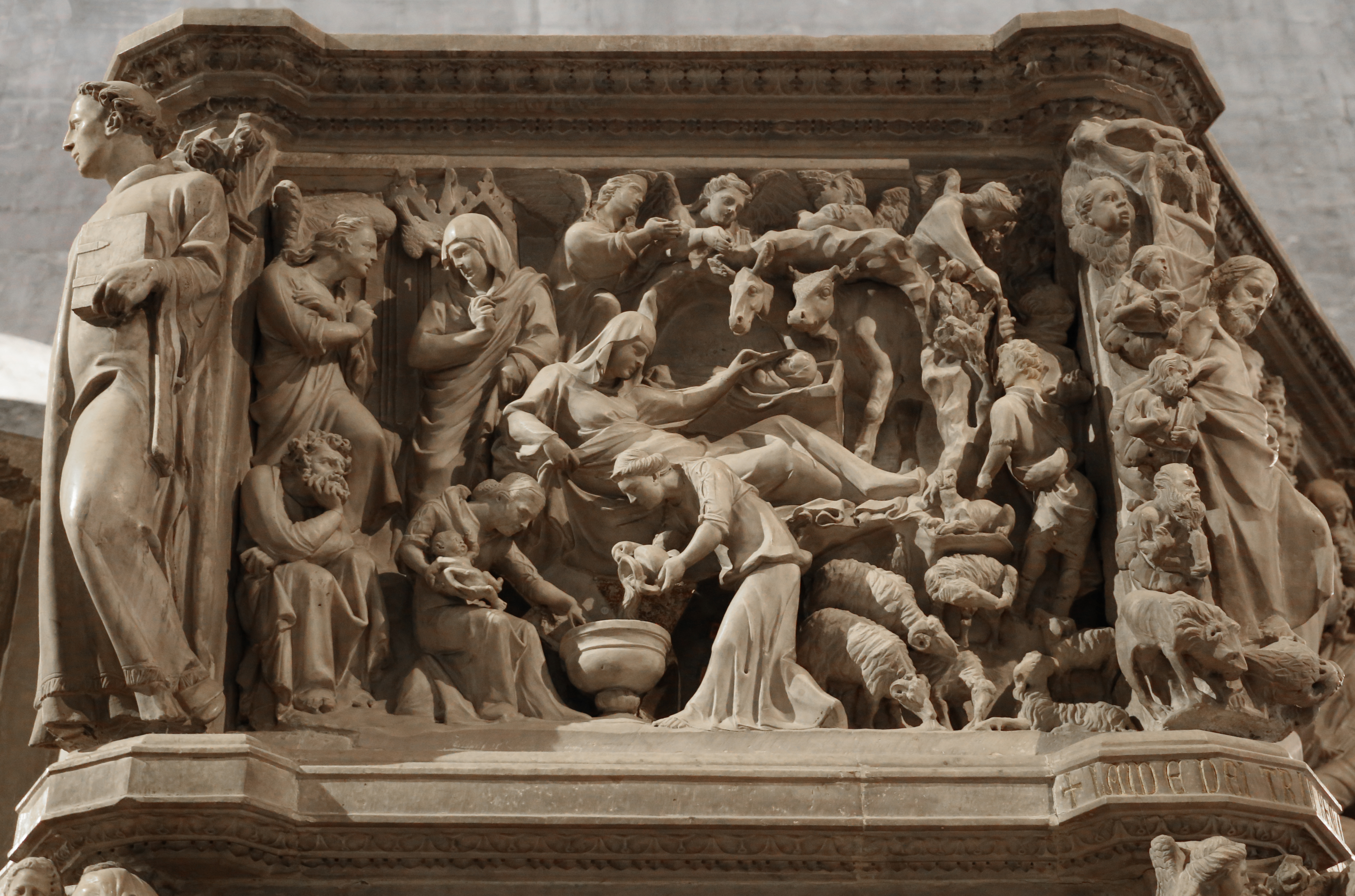
Annunciation, Nativity and Annunciation to the Shepherds

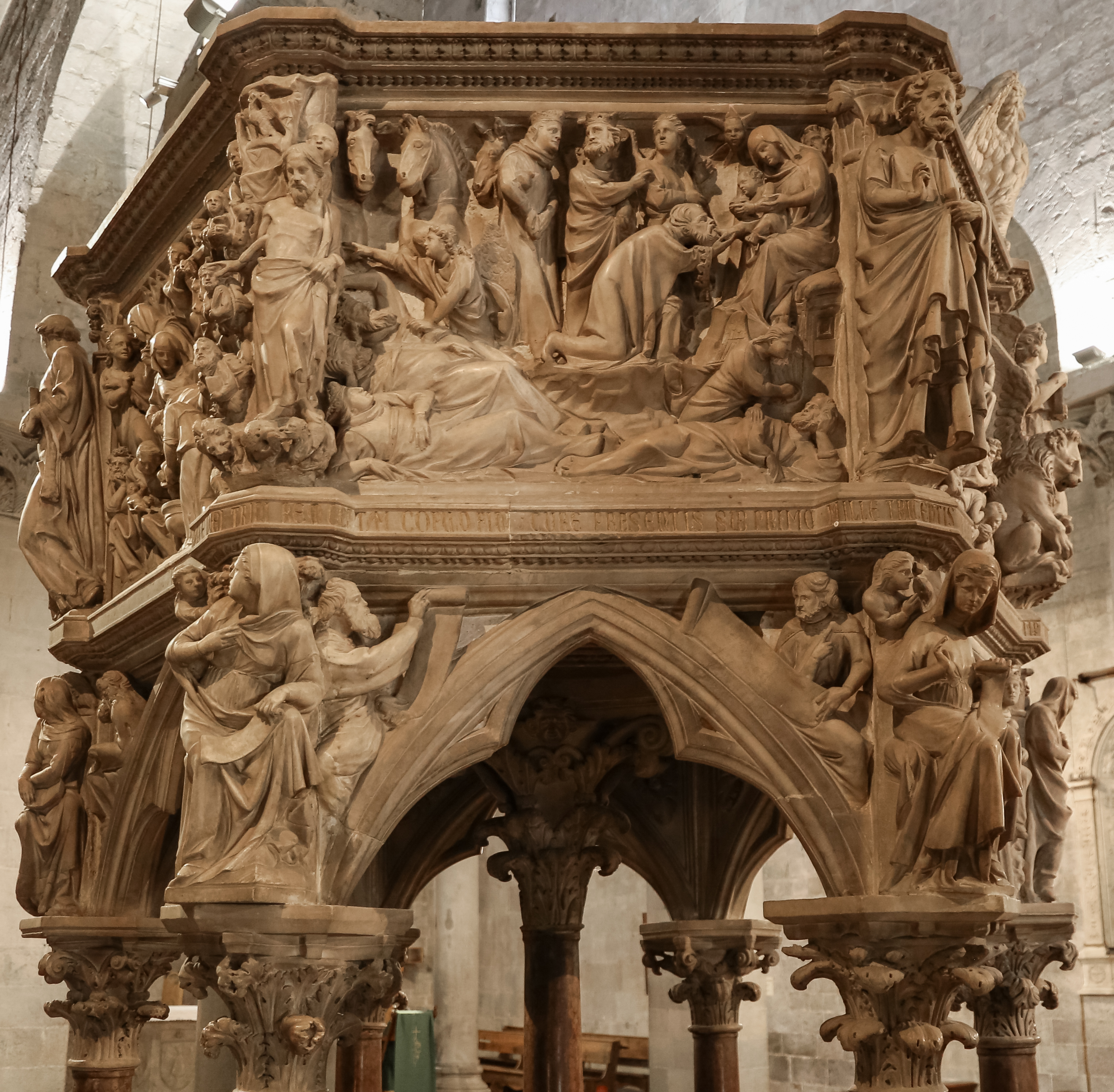
Dream of the Magi, Adoration of the Magi, Dream of Joseph

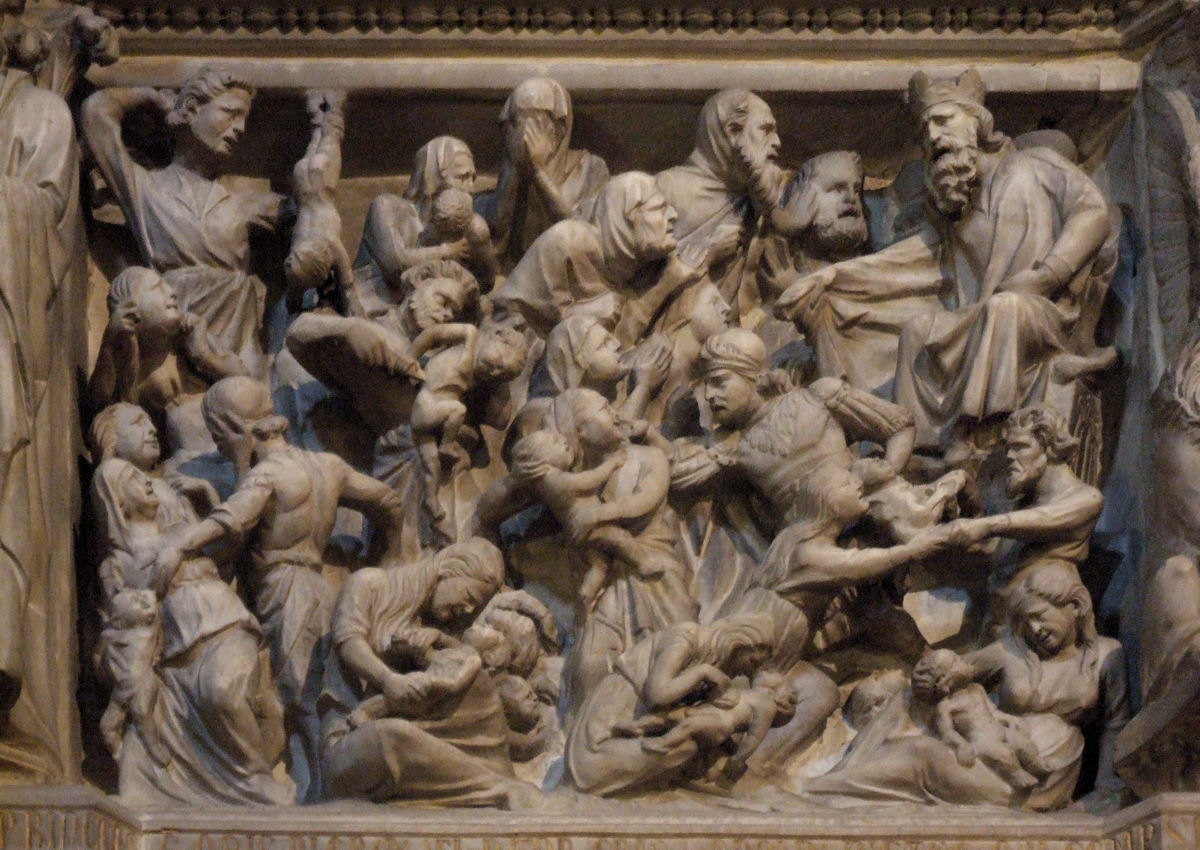
Massacre of the Innocents

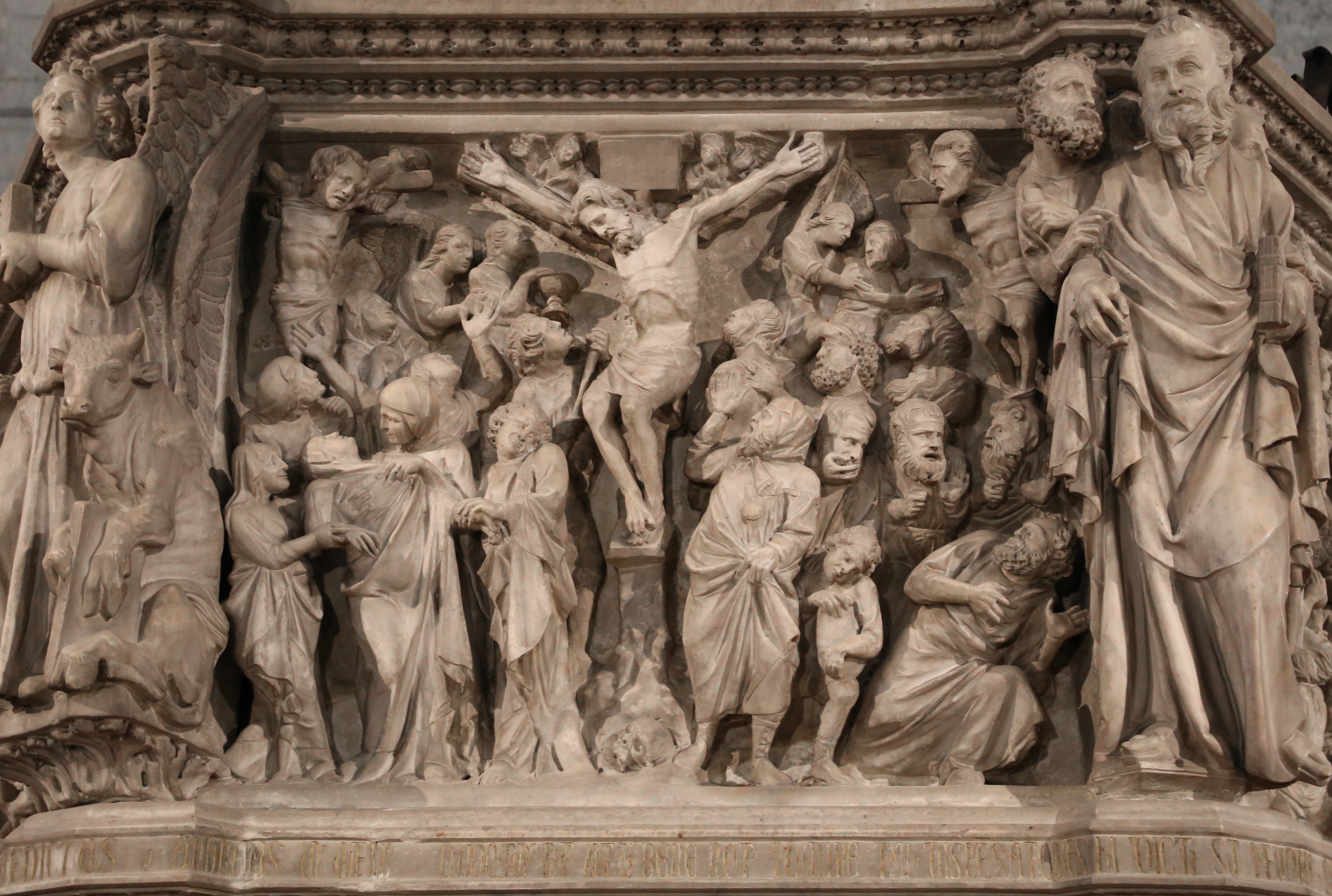
The Crucifixion

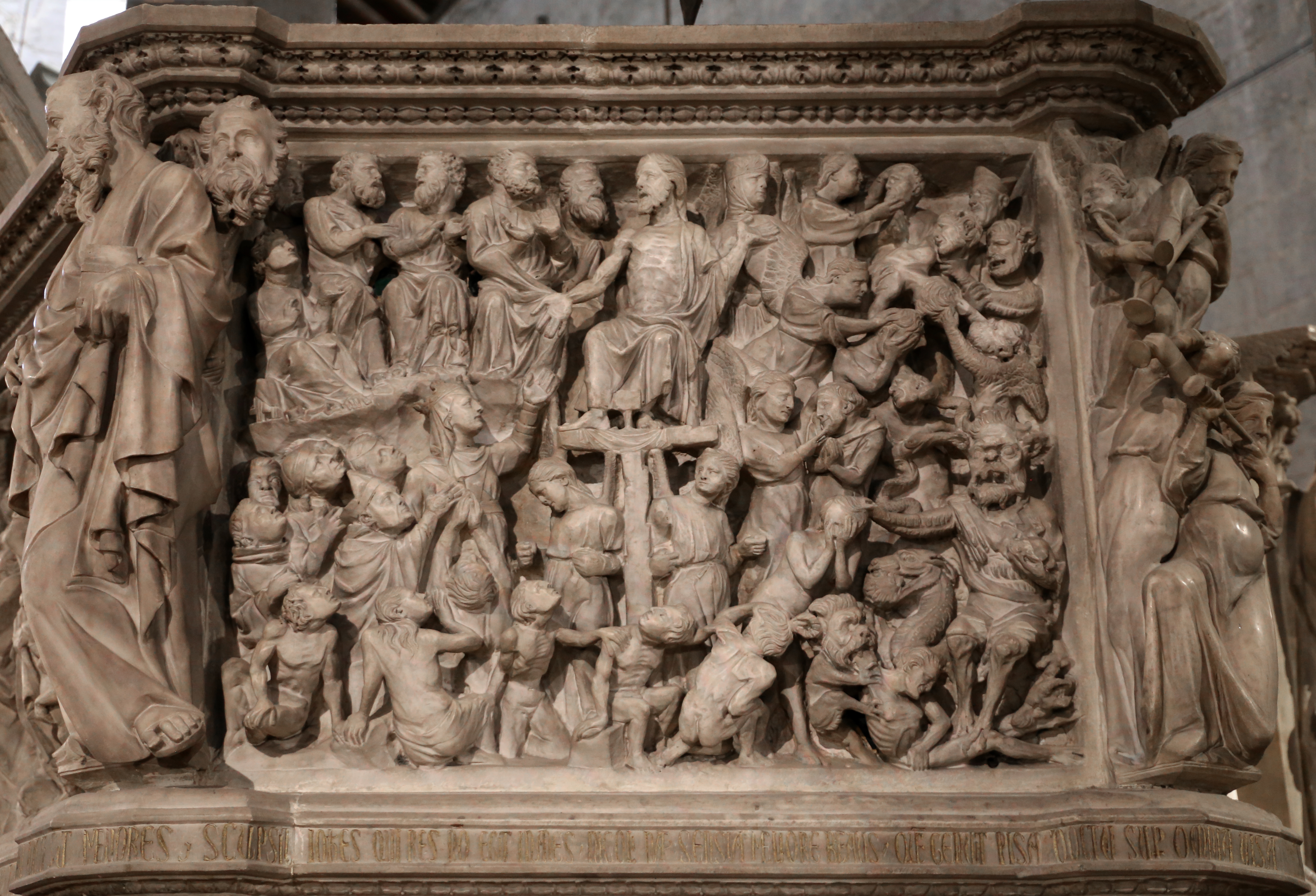
Last Judgement
