= Pulpit in the Pisa Baptistery =

Pulpit with sculpture by Nicola Pisano

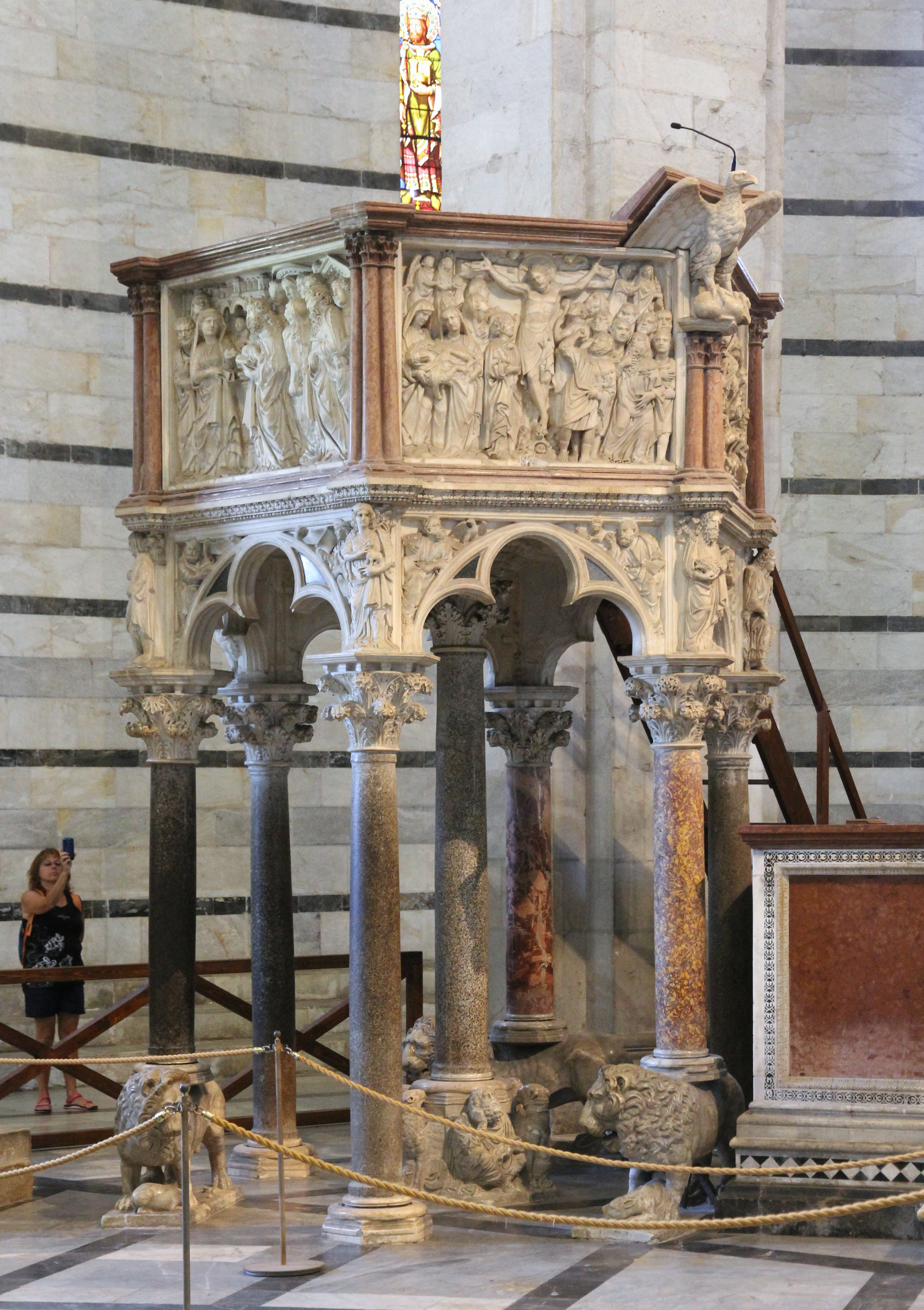
Pulpit in the Pisa Baptistery by Nicola Pisano, 1260

The pulpit in the Pisa Baptistery was completed by Nicola Pisano and his assistants in 1260, and has long been regarded as a landmark in Italian art, especially for its large relief panels around the platform. For Kenneth Clark the pulpit was "that false dawn of the Renaissance", as its innovations were not followed up for some time. The nude male figure, identified as Daniel or Fortitude, is based on a Roman Hercules, and has long been a particular focus of attention as "the first heroic nude in Italian art" (since antiquity).

Large raised pulpits, elaborately carved with relief panels, were important monuments in the Italian Duecento, with the best known including those of the baptistery at Pisa, of Siena Cathedral (1268) by Nicola and his son Giovanni Pisano, who went on to make the pulpit of Sant' Andrea in Pistoia (1297–1301), and that in Pisa Cathedral (1302–1310).

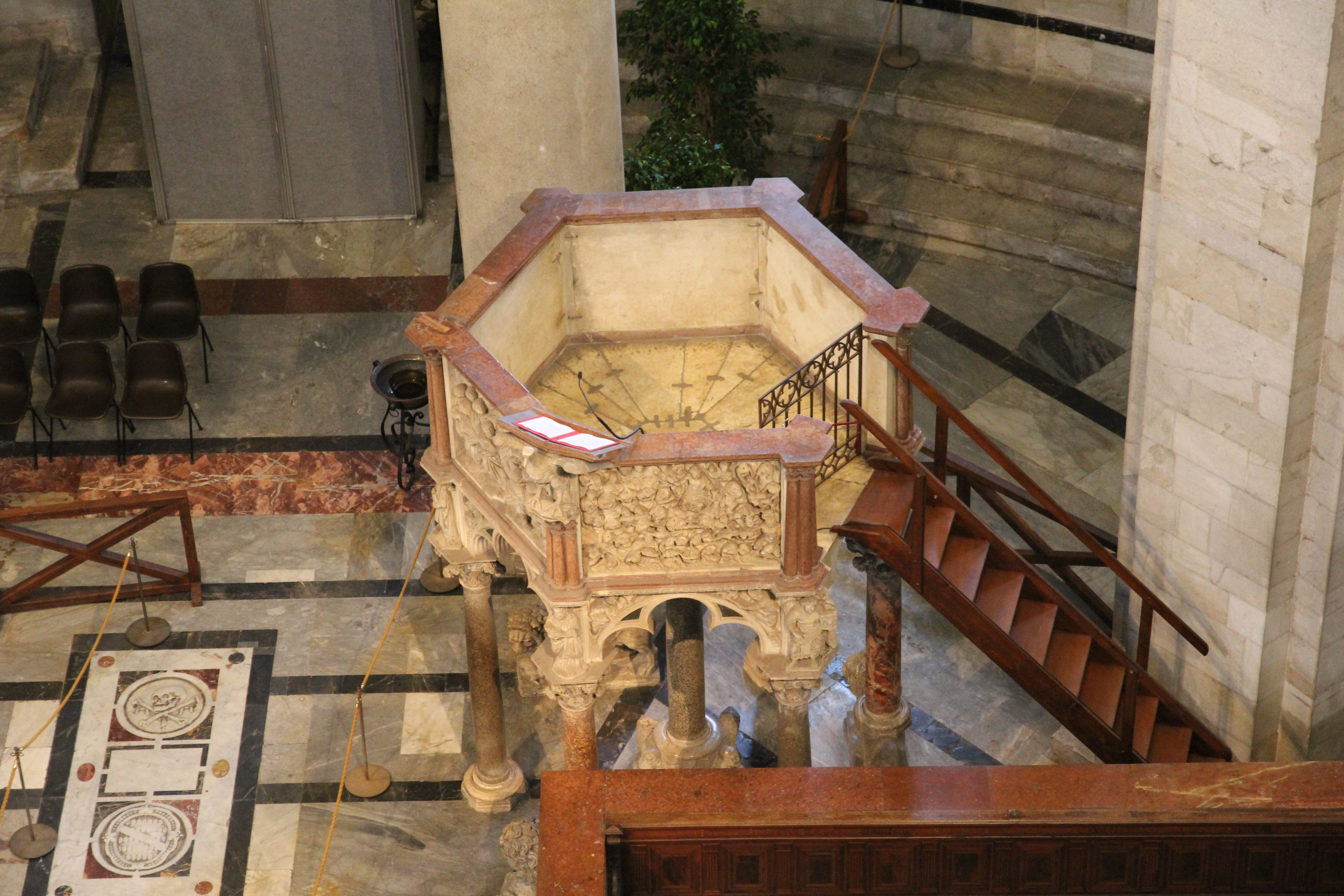
View from above

== Description ==
The pulpit is 415 cm high, 371 wide at the base, and 259.5 deep. The main reliefs measure 33.5 x 44.5 inches, and the single figures such as the Daniel/Fortitude figure 22 inches. The pulpit has a large platform, a regular hexagon held up by seven columns and currently reached by modern steps in wood. The outer face of the low parapet around this space has five panels in marble relief, showing scenes from the Life of Christ; the sixth side allows access. Many have suffered considerable damage, with heads and parts of bodies missing; the Napoleonic looting of art is usually blamed for this.

The seven columns, six at the corners of the hexagon, and one in the centre, have shafts of different lengths. The longer ones have a short base of mouldings, and the others rest on sculpted figures of lions, and in the centre a group of human and animal figures around a larger base. All have capitals at the top of the shaft (their style is discussed below).

The main body is made from Carrara marble, quarried nearby, for which Pisa was the main shipping port. The shafts of the columns and smaller "colonnettes" are of polished granite or a "variegated red marble". They are perhaps Roman spolia, perhaps from Orvieto.

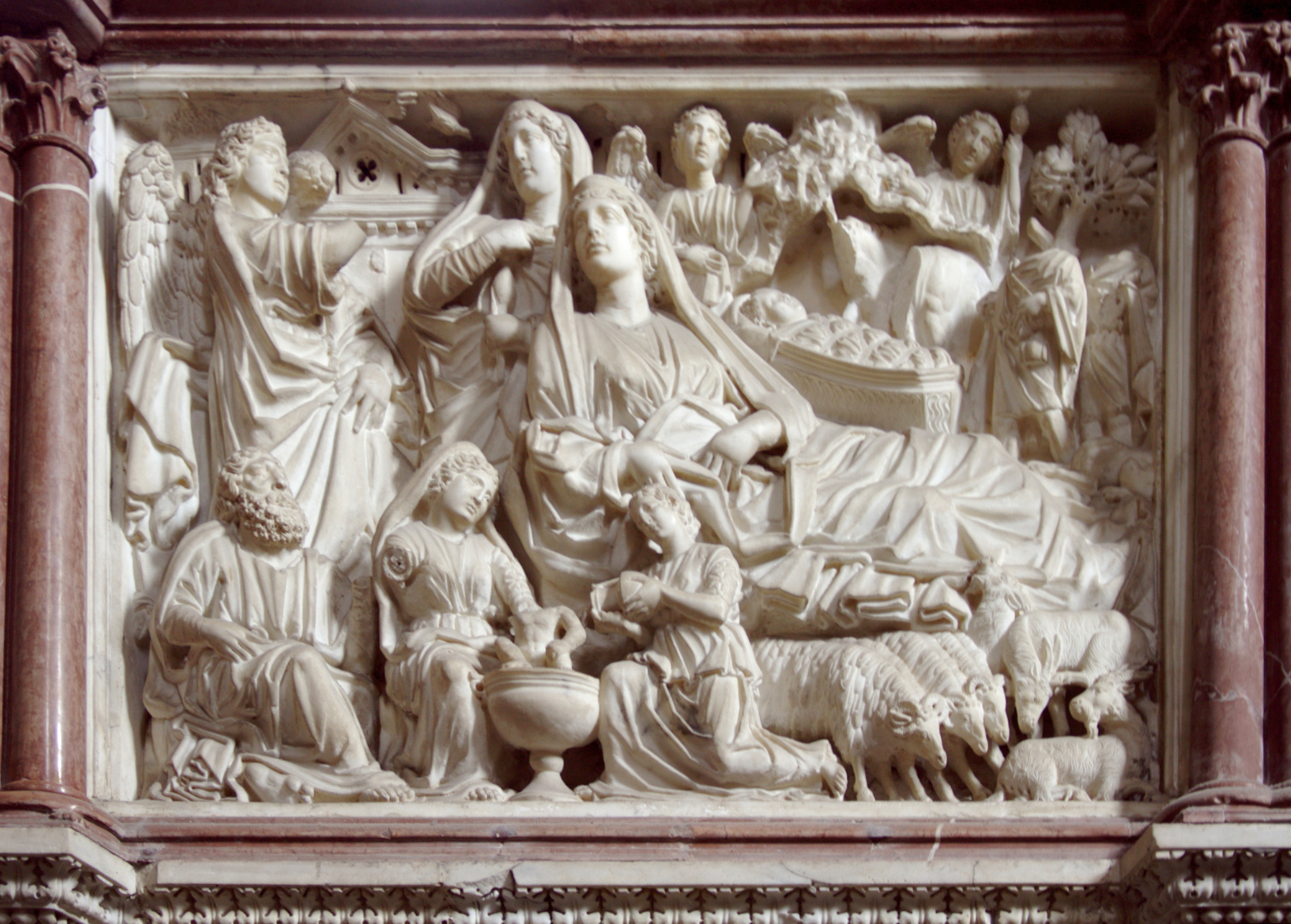
Nativity, including Annunciation, Adoration of the Shepherds, and a Washing of the Christ Child.

=== Large reliefs ===
The most famous panel is the Nativity scene, which is combined with an Annunciation at top left, an Adoration of the Shepherds at right, and a Washing of the Christ Child at the bottom. The Virgin Mary appears twice, as does the baby Jesus. The Jesus in the bath, as usual seeming rather well-developed for a newborn, has lost his head and an arm, and the ox and ass behind the manger holding the other Jesus are cut off at the bottom of the neck. The "massive, reclining figure of the Virgin" in the Nativity dominates the scene, while the "immediately juxtaposed repetition of her head in that of the Virgin Annunciate creates a strong central accent which was once completed by the now mutilated figure of the Christ Child".

There is a clear hieratic progression in the size of the figures, with the reclining figure of the Nativity Virgin the largest. She is far larger than the trio at the bottom and front of the picture space: Saint Joseph and the two nurses. This hieratic element is much less marked in the other reliefs, though still present. The scenes become progressively more crowded with figures, perhaps suggesting that they were designed in their narrative sequence.

The series continues with an Adoration of the Magi, a Presentation of Jesus at the Temple, Crucifixion of Jesus, and finally a Last Judgment. An eagle lectern, an eagle with spread wings on which books and papers could be rested, projects at the corner between the Crucifixion and the Last Judgement.

It is certain, from some remains, that the backgrounds had "strongly patterned vitreous glazes on a gesso foundation". Some of the figures have inset black pieces for the pupils of the eyes, a common practice, and very likely the whole reliefs were painted in colours.

=== Middle level ===
Below the Last Judgement is a carved inscription:

ANNO MILLENO BIS CENTUM BISQUE TRICENO HOC OPUS INSINGNE SCULPSIT NICOLA PISANUS LAUDETUR DINGNE TAM BENE DOCTA MANUS (In the year 1260, Nicola Pisano carved this noble work. May so greatly gifted a hand be praised as it deserves).

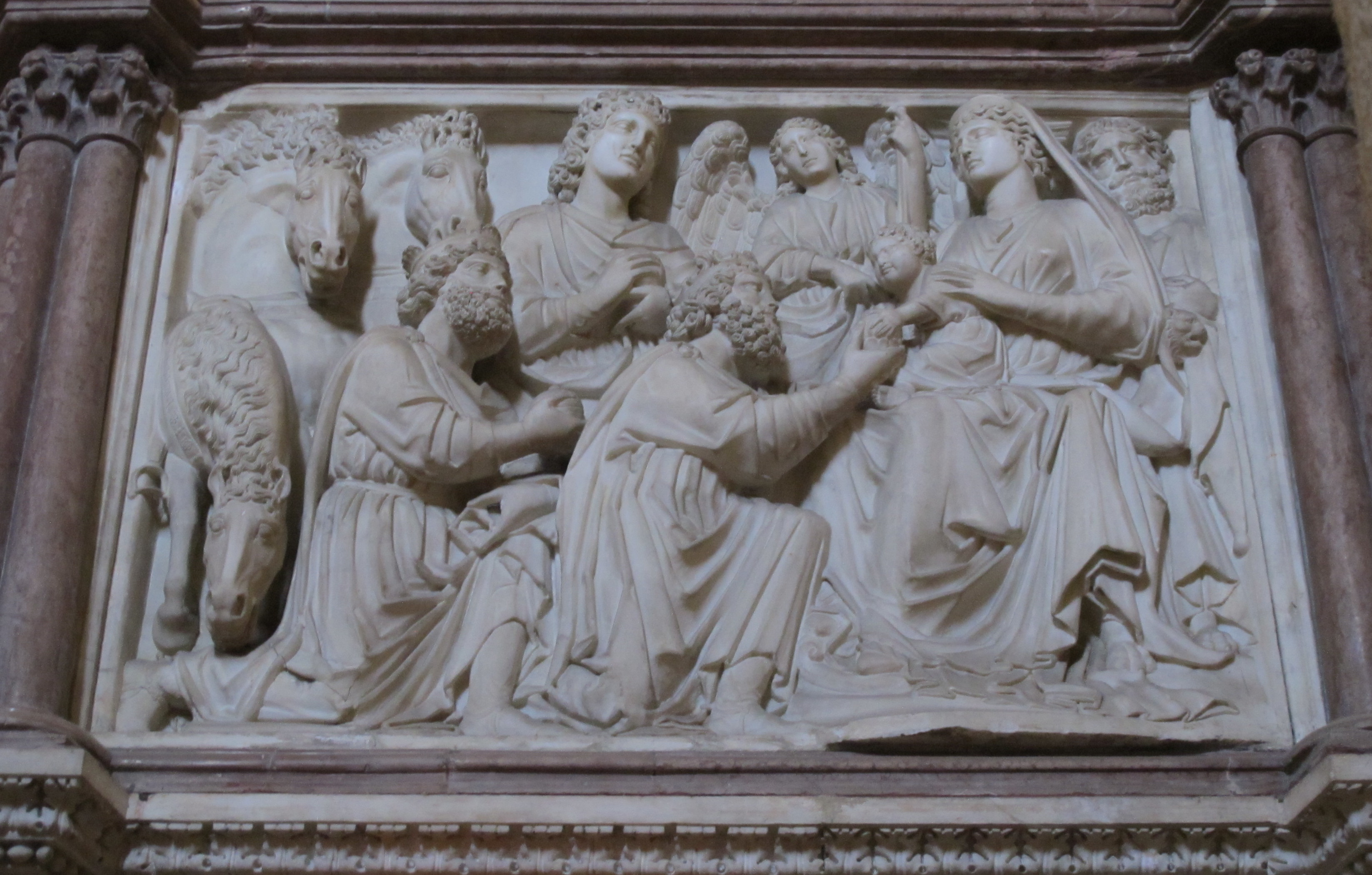
Adoration of the Magi

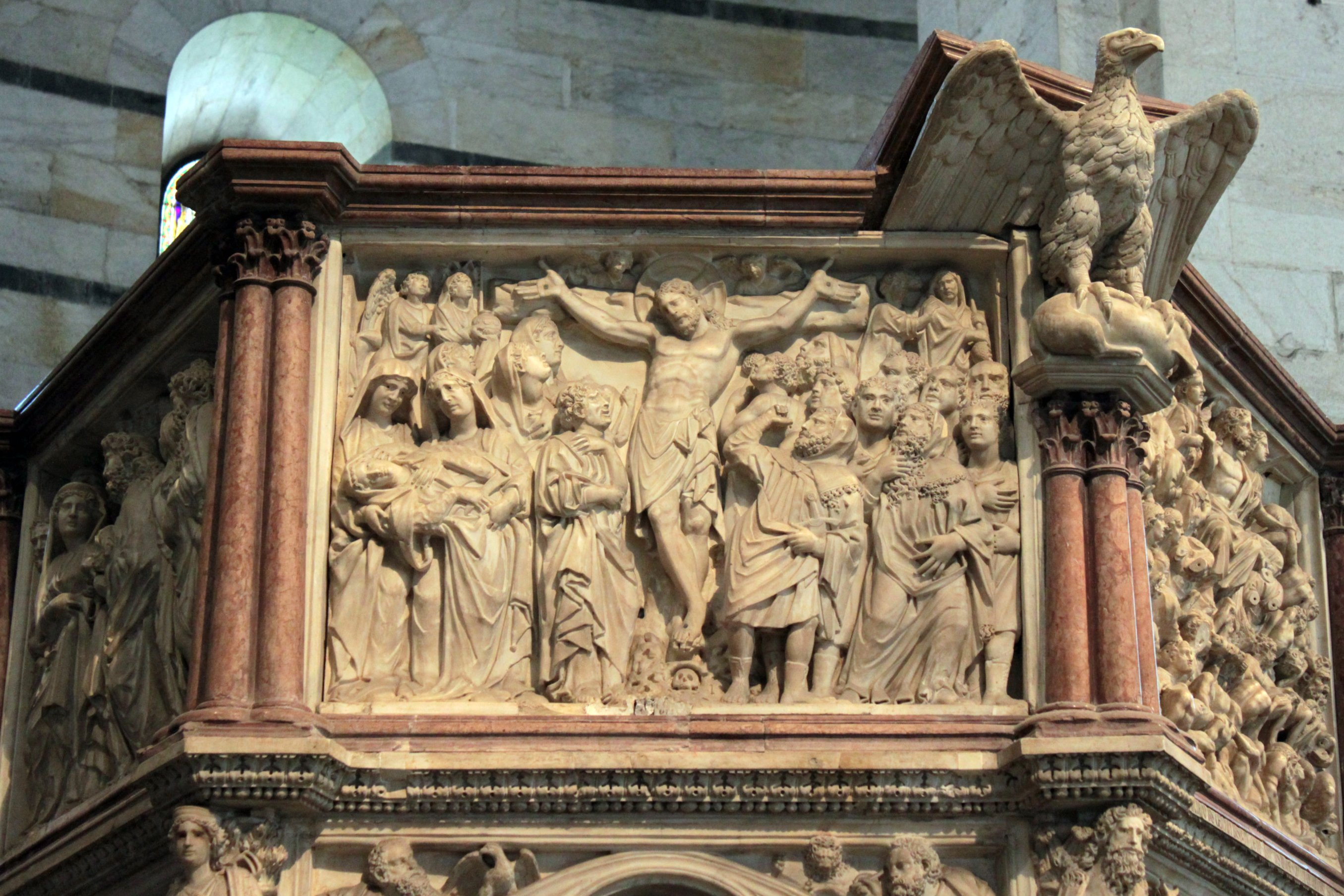
Crucifixion of Jesus

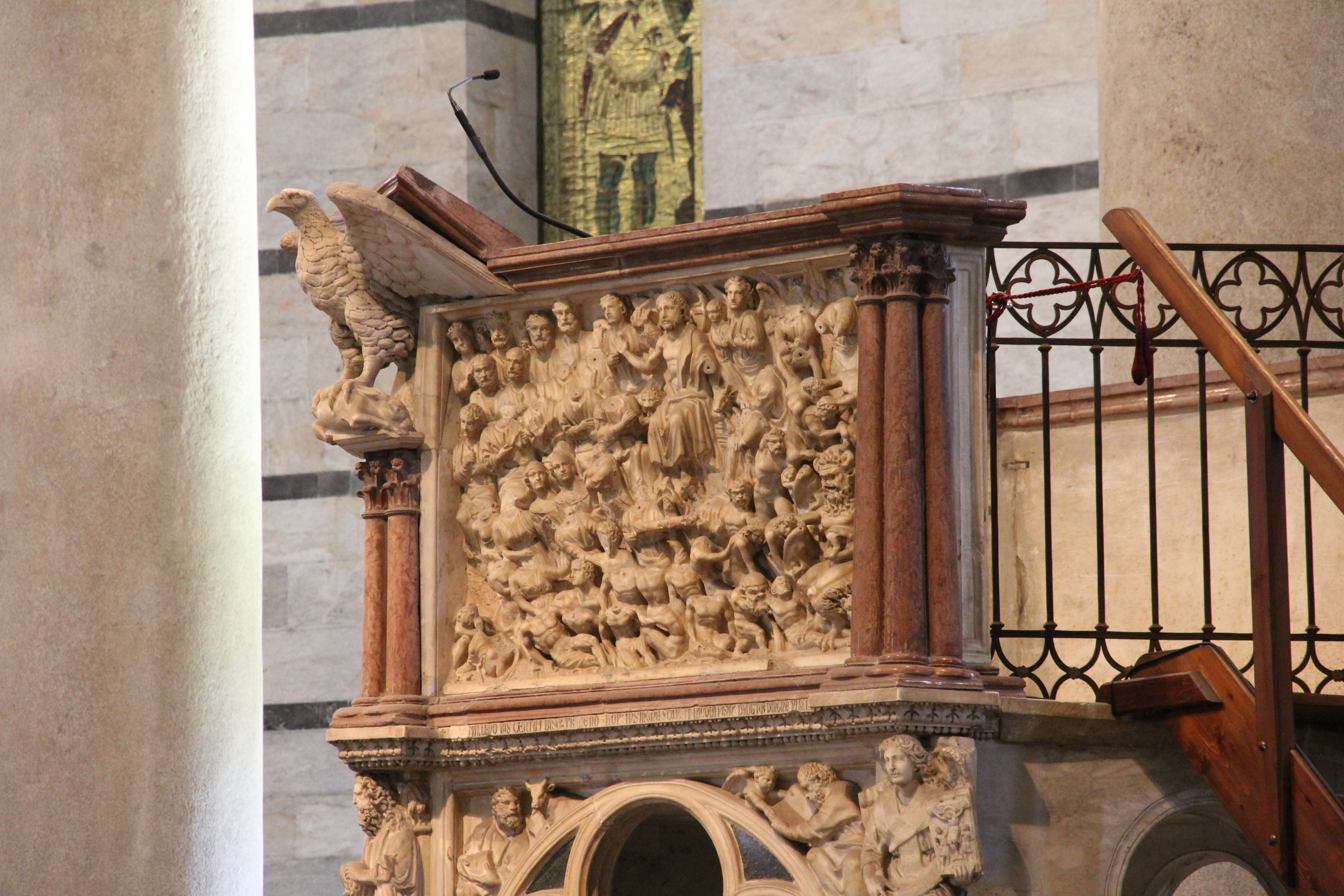
Last Judgment, with inscription below, and eagle above

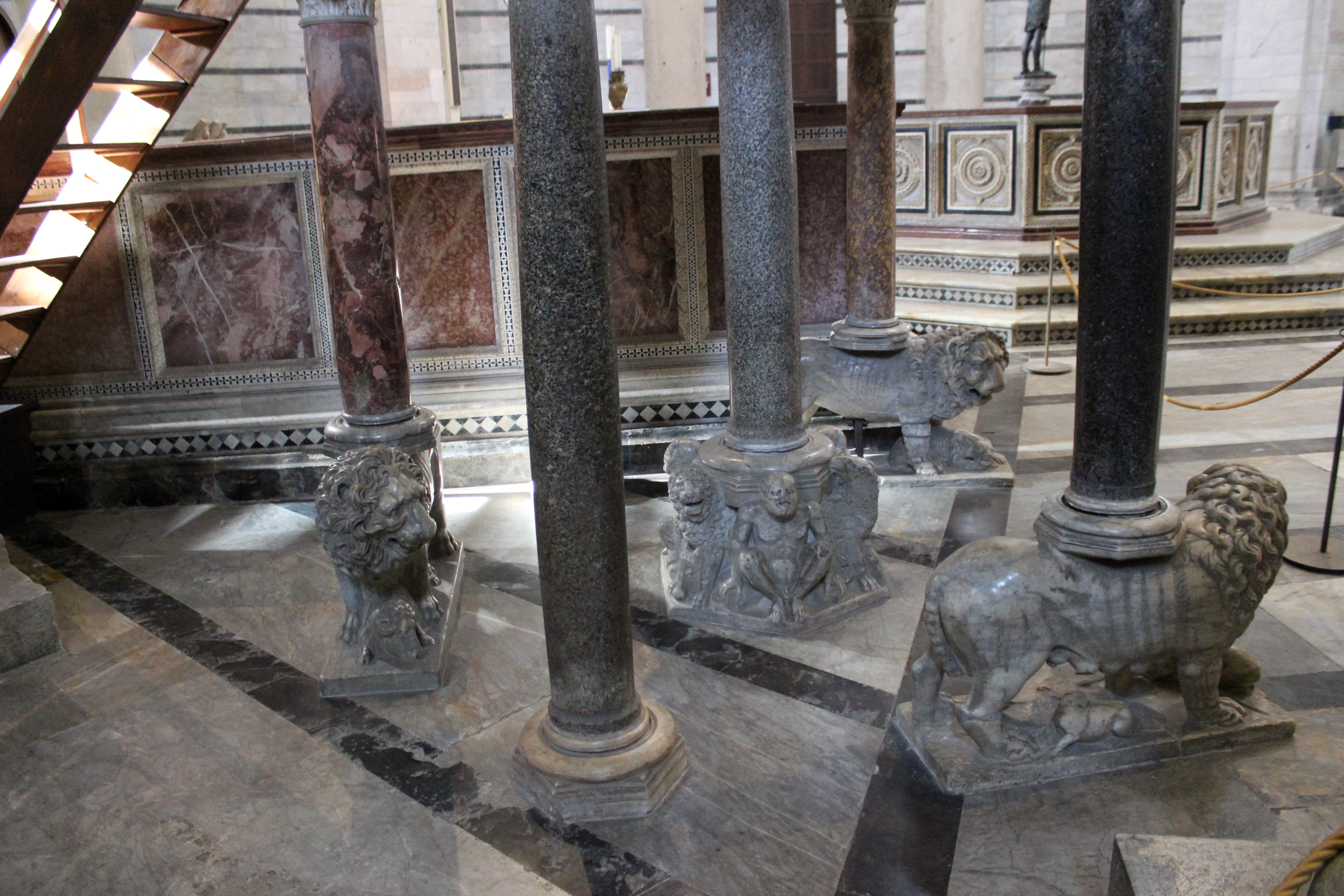
Ground level

Below this there is a zone where six relatively small relief figures, "almost in the round", fill the spaces between the capitals of the columns and "an archivolt formed of trilobe arches with pierced cusps" under the panels. Their subjects are often taken to be the "Christian Virtues" (Charity, Fortitude, Temperance, Prudence, St John the Baptist, and Faith), but there has been a good deal of discussion over this, and even by 2000 "it has not been possible to obtain general consent even about the names of most of these figures". The most famous is the nude male said to represent Daniel as "Fortitude", who is (all are agreed) clearly based on classical images of Hercules, in a contrapposto pose. These figures are joined by arched elements with figures in the spandrels of the Four Evangelists, with miniature attributes, and Old Testament kings and prophets.

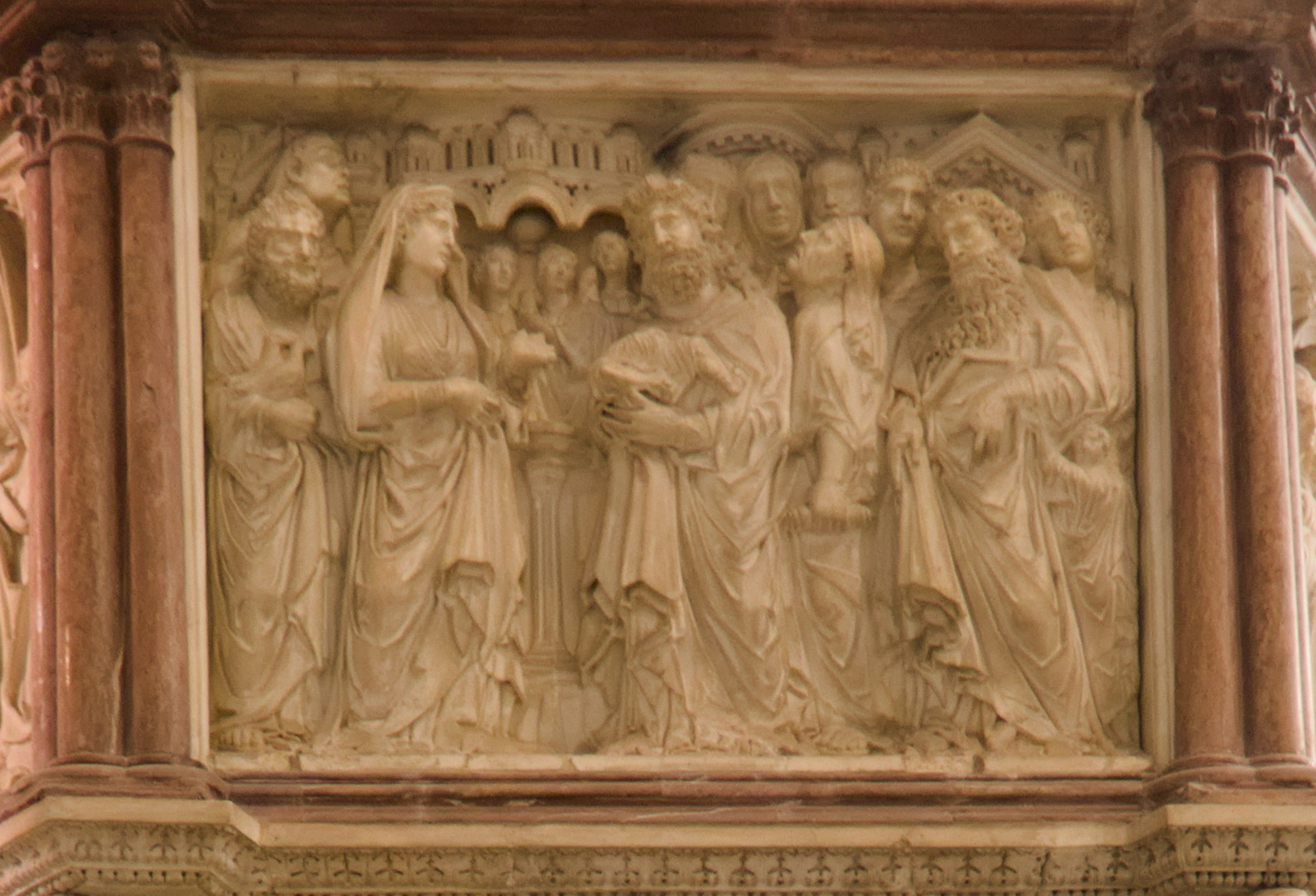
Presentation in the Temple

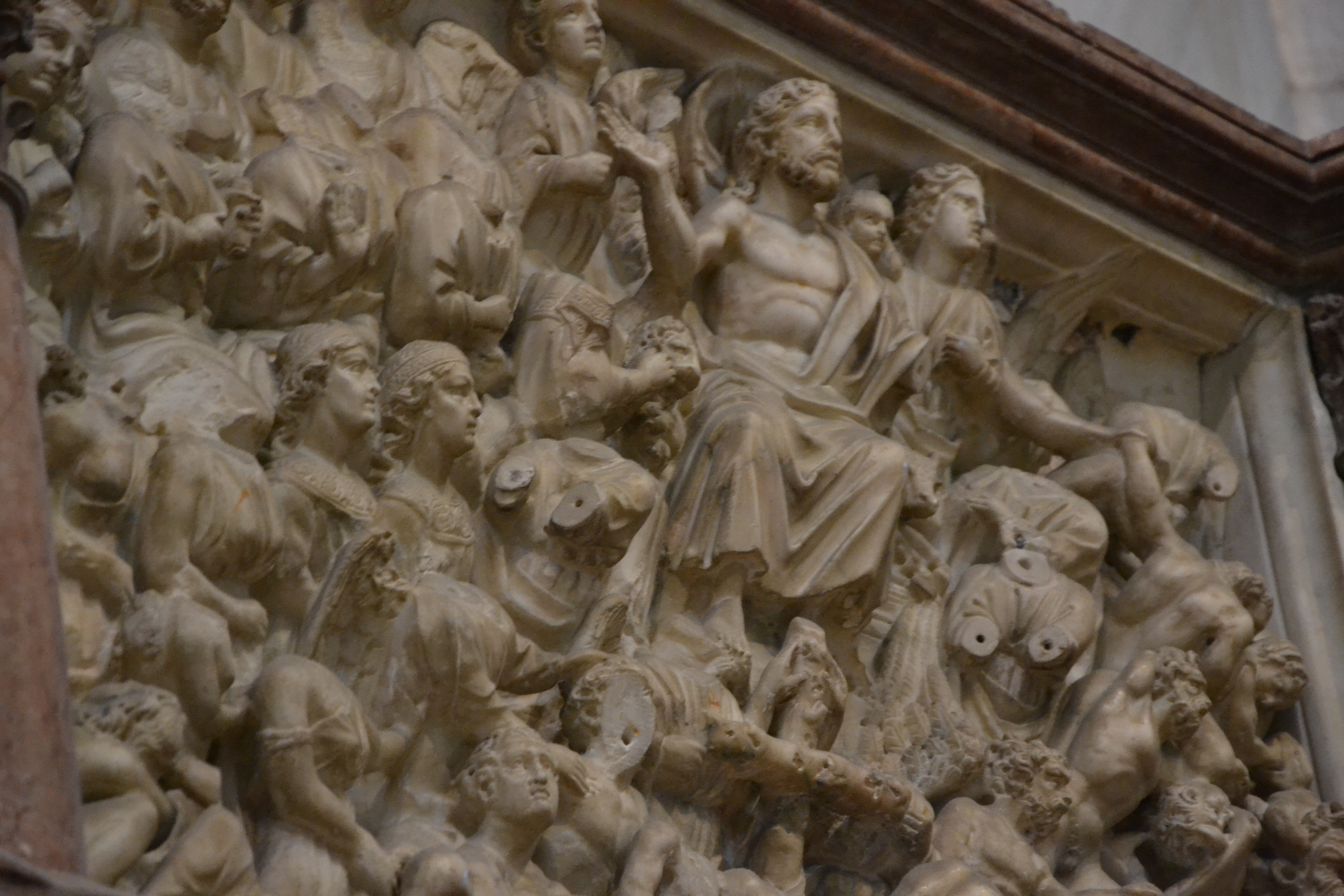
Detail of Last Judgment

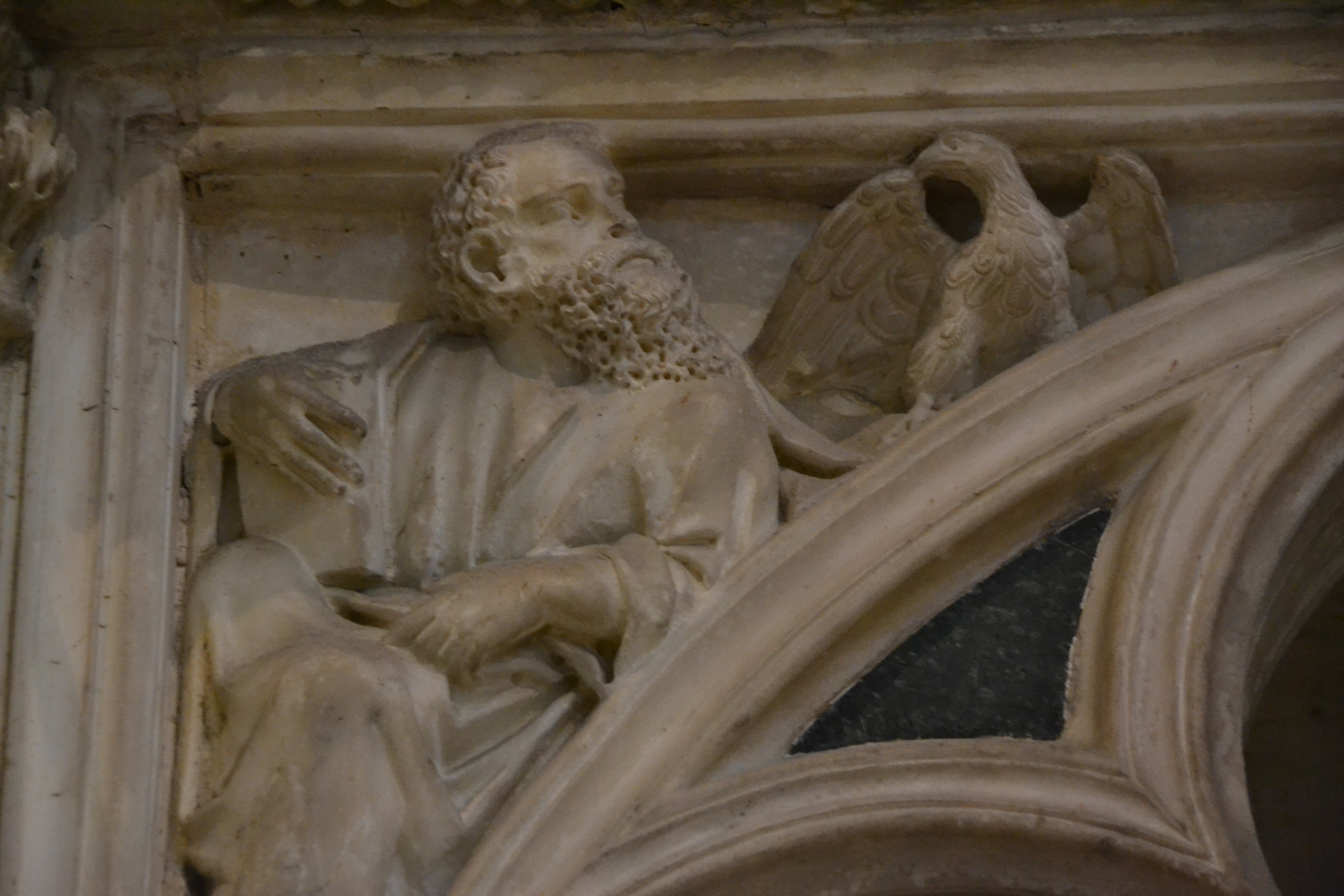
Saint John the Evangelist, with eagle attribute, in a spandrel

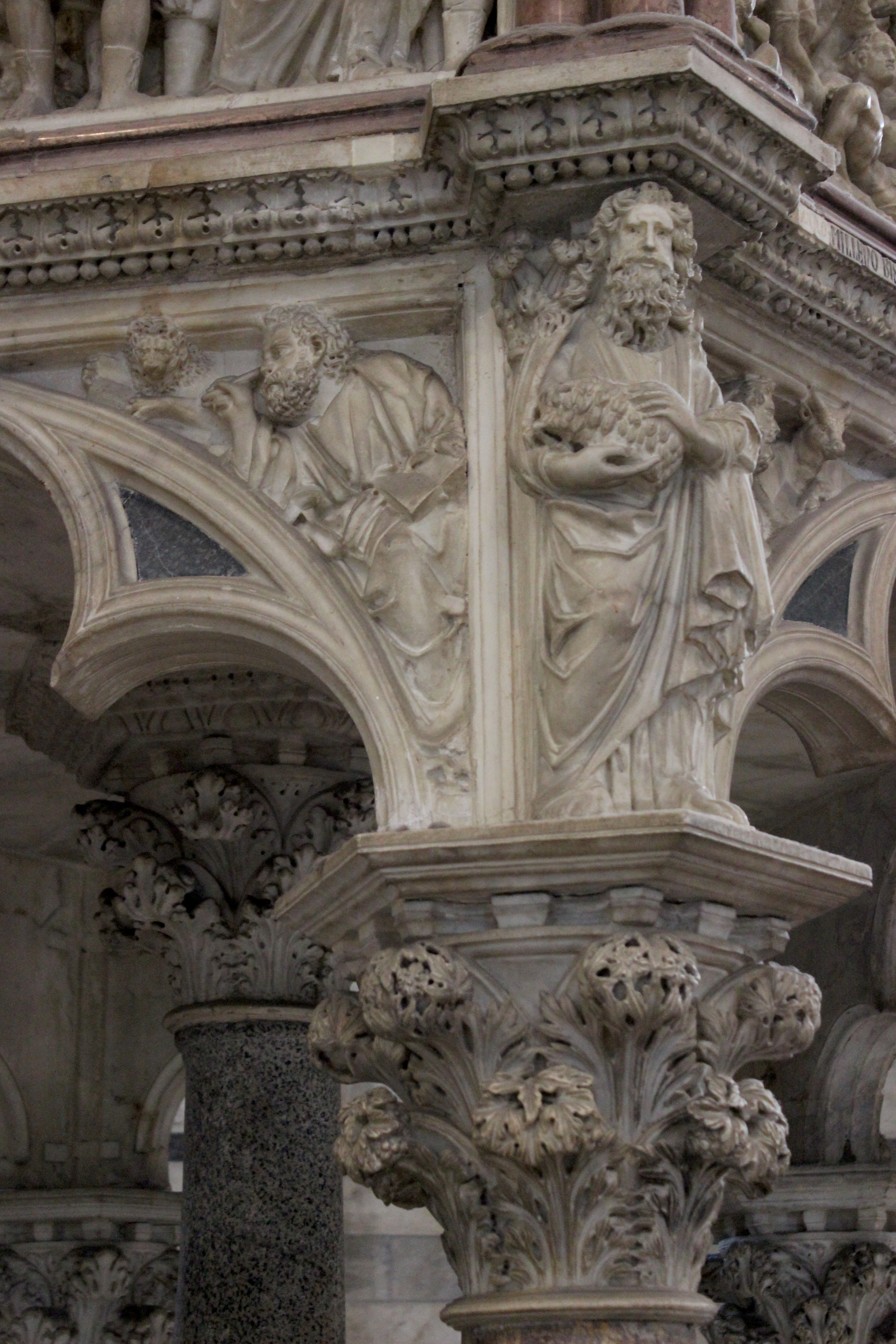
Corner, at the mid-level

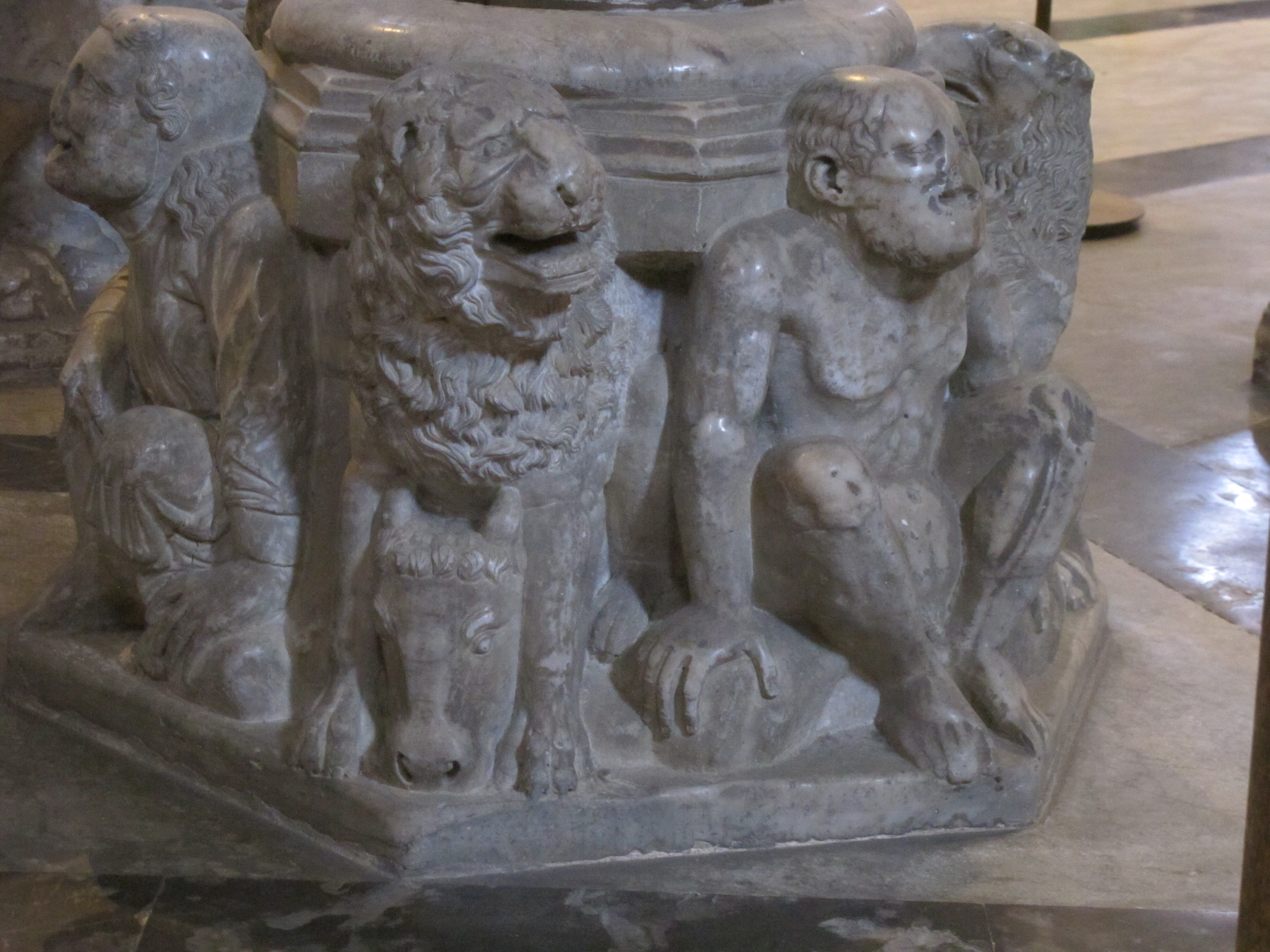
The base of the central column

== Sources and influences ==
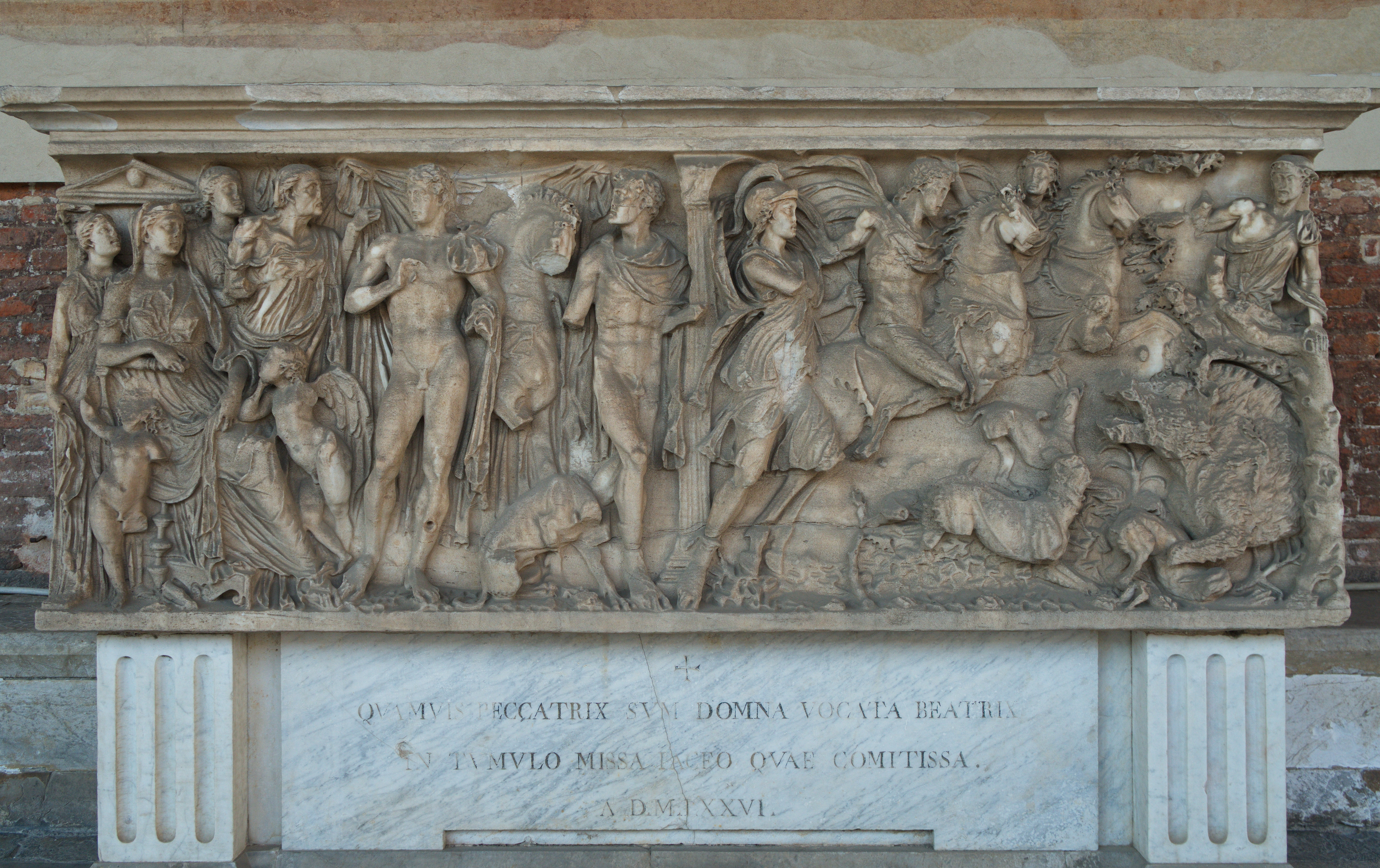
Roman sarcopagus with Phaedra (far left) and Hippolytus of Athens, 1–2 ct., Camposanto, Pisa

The pulpit is famous for its very early and effective revival of Roman forms and styles, but has considerable elements from both the prevailing Romanesque and the new Gothic style then entering Italy from the north. The city of Pisa regarded itself as a stronghold of enduring Romanitas, and an unusual number of Roman sculptures, mostly sarcophagi, were already on display, mostly around the Piazza dei Miracoli or cathedral precinct in which the baptistery sits.

In particular, one sarcophagus, at that point actually placed on the cathedral facade, has a seated figure of Phaedra which Nicola followed closely for the Virgin in his Adoration of the Magi, as was already noticed by Vasari. The Simeon at far right in the Presentation is based on a Roman Dionysus; both are supported by a young figure, respectively an acolyte and a satyr.

Elements which have been noted as retaining older medieval styles, Romanesque and Italo-Byzantine, include drapery which "breaks into sharp angles providing an all-over network" rather than classical fluidity, and the disproportionately large head of the Daniel/Hercules.

The Nativity has the Byzantine elements of the cave and the Virgin reclining on a klinē (couch), as well as the midwives bathing the baby Jesus below the Virgin.

Other elements draw from northern Gothic; the six arches below the platform are "just barely pointed", but have three-lobed tracery in the French Gothic manner. The capitals of the columns have "a classical firmness and precision" but the "projecting acanthus leaves resemble the much freer naturalistic foliate ornament in French Gothic cathedrals".

There is a similar blending of influences in the crowded Last Judgement panel, with a "French Gothic Christ", although "it is typical of Nicola that in this most French of scenes he should reach back to the Antique relief style of the battle sarcophagi with their even scattering of figures over the whole surface".

The figure of the crucified Christ here appears to be the first Italian use of the "Gothic innovation" of the "three-nail type", with a single nail piercing both feet, rather than the previous four-nail type with a different nail for each foot. The crossing of the legs this requires creates a curving rhythm in the legs, giving an "impression of plastic volume and organic movement".

== Context ==
=== The artists ===
This is the earliest known work by Nicola Pisano, but he must have been an experienced and highly regarded master to have been given such an important and complex commission; he was probably working in Pisa by 1250. His assistants probably included his young son Giovanni Pisano, who said he was born in Pisa, and Arnolfo di Cambio, but unlike his next large job, the Siena Cathedral Pulpit, there are no known documents recording the workers and payments. More than in the Siena pulpit, the Pisa one "seems largely to be due to a single hand", with "an apparently effortless technical virtuosity, particularly with the drill".

After some work on the Arca di San Domenico in Bologna in 1264–1265, and the Siena pulpit, completed in 1268, Nicola's last known project was the Fontana Maggiore in Perugia, completed in 1278. By 1284 he was dead.

=== The Baptistery ===
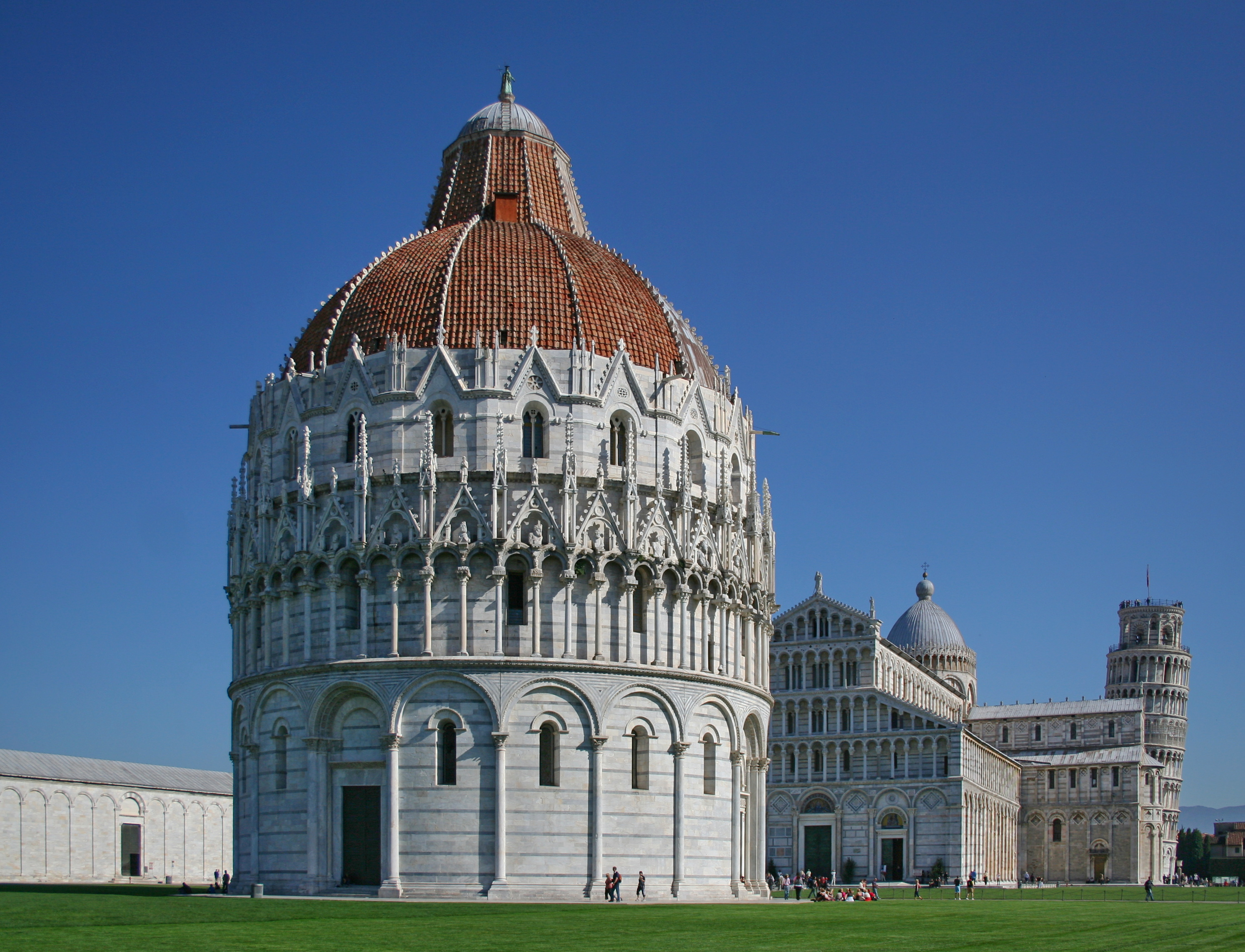
The Pisa Baptistery with Pisa Cathedral and the Leaning Tower of Pisa (the campanile) behind

In most of Europe the early Christian practice of having a distinct baptistery building, useful when large numbers of adult catechumens were being instructed and then baptised in groups by immersion, had lapsed by the Late Middle Ages, when baptisms were normally of infants, and used sprinkling with holy water rather than immersion. Instead, smaller fonts were placed inside the church. But in north Italy separate baptisteries revived, probably largely as an expression of civic pride, placed beside the cathedral, and often with a separate campanile or bell-tower.

Among the more spectacular Romanesque and Gothic examples, the Florence Baptistery was built between 1059 and 1128, the Parma Baptistery was begun in 1196, Pistoia in 1303; all these have octagonal exteriors. The Siena Baptistery was begun in 1316, then left incomplete some decades later.

In Pisa the baptistery's hexagonal pulpit closes a "contrapuntal rhythm" of geometrical shapes: the baptistery itself is circular, the altar enclosure rectangular, the font (1246) octagonal, and internally "the conical inner dome stands on a dodecagon". Apart from the "still, mathematical dance of architectural form", these numbers were probably understood as having a religious significance.

== Replica ==
The Weston Cast Court in the Victoria and Albert Museum in London has a full-scale replica plaster cast, with paint, made in 1864 by Messrs Franchi & Son of London and bought for £116 13s 4d.
