= Siena Cathedral Pulpit =

Pulpit with sculpture by Nicola Pisano

Coordinates: 43°19′03″N 11°19′44″E

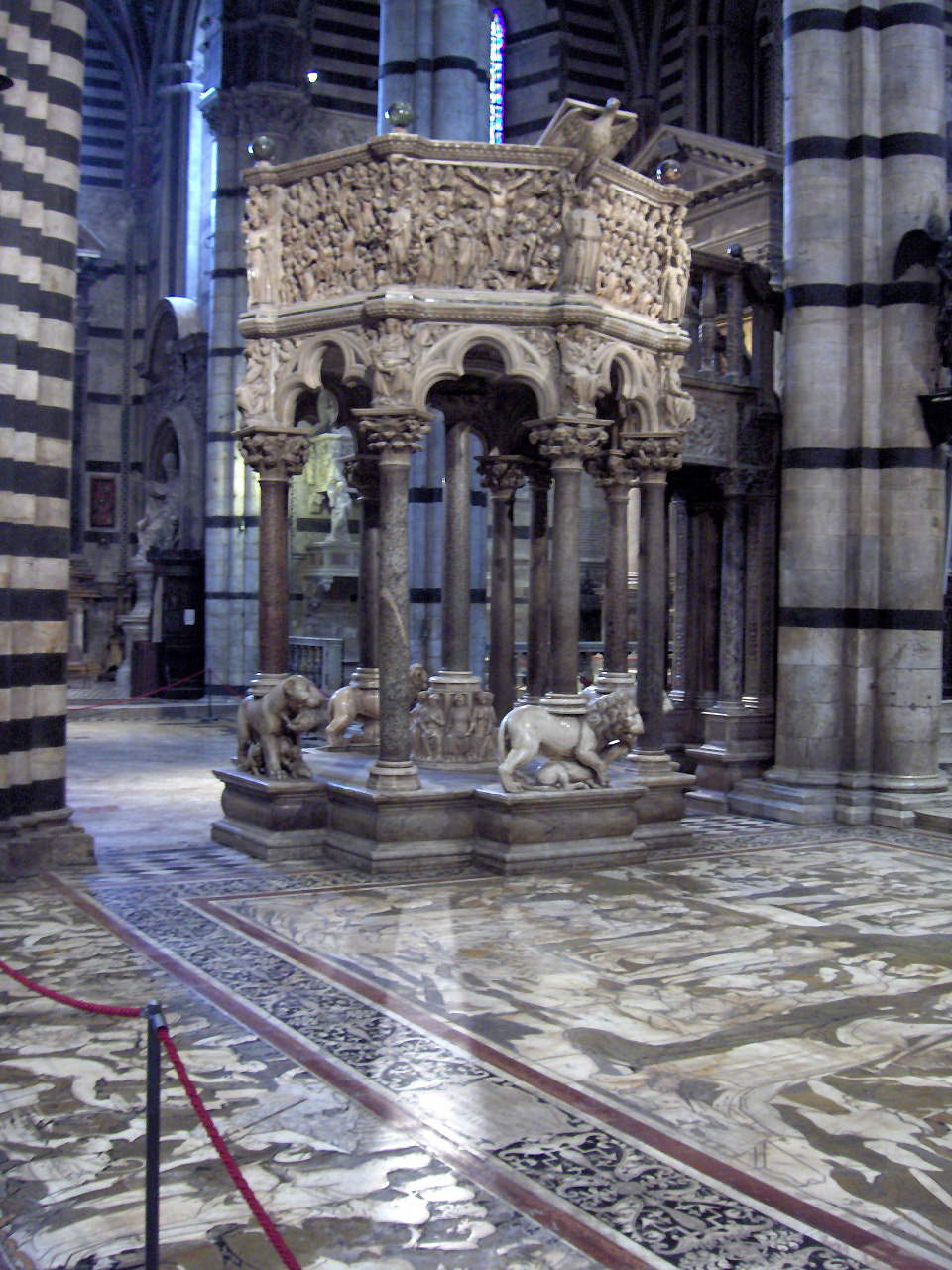
Siena Cathedral Pulpit and the mosaic floor

The Siena Cathedral Pulpit is an octagonal structure in Siena Cathedral sculpted by Nicola Pisano and his assistants Arnolfo di Cambio, Lapo di Ricevuto, and Nicolas' son Giovanni Pisano between the fall of 1265 and the fall of 1268. The pulpit, with its seven narrative panels and nine decorative columns carved out of Carrara marble, showcases Nicola Pisano's talent for integrating classical themes into Christian traditions, making both Nicola Pisano and the Siena pulpit forerunners of the classical revival of the Italian Renaissance.

== History ==
The prosperity of the city of Siena during the thirteenth century led to an increase in civic pride and interest in public works. In 1196, the cathedral masons' guild, the Opera di Santa Maria, was commissioned to construct a new cathedral to take the place of the original structure that was built in the ninth century. Many artists were commissioned to gild the interior and the façade of the new cathedral. For the construction of the pulpit, a contract was drawn up in Pisa on September 29, 1265, between the artist Nicola Pisano and the Cistercian Fra Melano, who was the Master of the cathedral works of Siena.

Nicola had earned fame from his work on the pulpit in the Pisa Baptistery, which he had finished in 1260. This contract stipulated precise clauses such as "the materials, times of work (Nicola was to be absent only for 60 days a year) payment and collaborators." It also stated that there were to be seven panels instead of five such as in Pisa and it also stated that Pisano needed to use the Sienese Carrara marble. "For this labour Nicola, magister lapisorum, would receive eight Pisan soldi per day, his two pupils Arnolfo di Cambio and Lapo would each receive six soldi per day and—should he work—then ... Nicoli was to receive four soldi per day, to be paid to his father."

== The artist ==
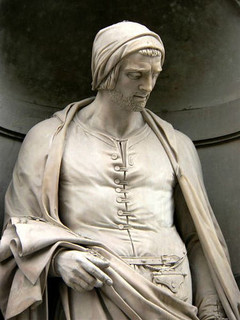
Much later sculpture of Nicola Pisano

According to the Siena Cathedral archives, Nicola Pisano was born to Petrus de Apulia between 1200 and 1205 in Apulia. Nicola may have trained in the imperial workshops of Holy Roman Emperor Frederick II who encouraged artists towards the "revival of classical forms" where "the representational traditions of classical art were given new life and spiritual force". Frederick favoured the fusion of the classical and Christian traditions.

Before his commission on the Siena Cathedral Pulpit, Nicola had worked on two griffin heads in Apulia modeled with "light surface undulations, giving a soft chiaroscuro effect" which shows that he was influenced by Roman sculpture early on in his career. Commenting on the inspiration that Roman sarcophagi had on Nicola, Vasari wrote, "Nicola, pondering over the beauty of this work and being greatly pleased therewith, put so much study and diligence into imitating this manner and some other good sculptures that were in these other ancient sarcophagi, that he was judged, after no long time, the best sculptor of his day; there being in Tuscany in those times."

Nicolas' first recorded work was the pulpit inside the Baptistery in Pisa, Italy in 1260. This piece is the forerunner of the Sienese pulpit in multiple ways. One being the "Synthesis of French Gothic and Classical elements and incorporates a programme of great complexity." This Pisan pulpit is also raised up on columns three "resting on plain bases" and three "resting on the backs of lions" This pulpit, like the Sienese one also has rectangular relief panels that contain the Narrative of the life of Christ, but is told in only six sections where as there are eight panels on Siena's pulpit. With the Pisan pulpit we see Nicola hone his classical style.

== The pulpit ==
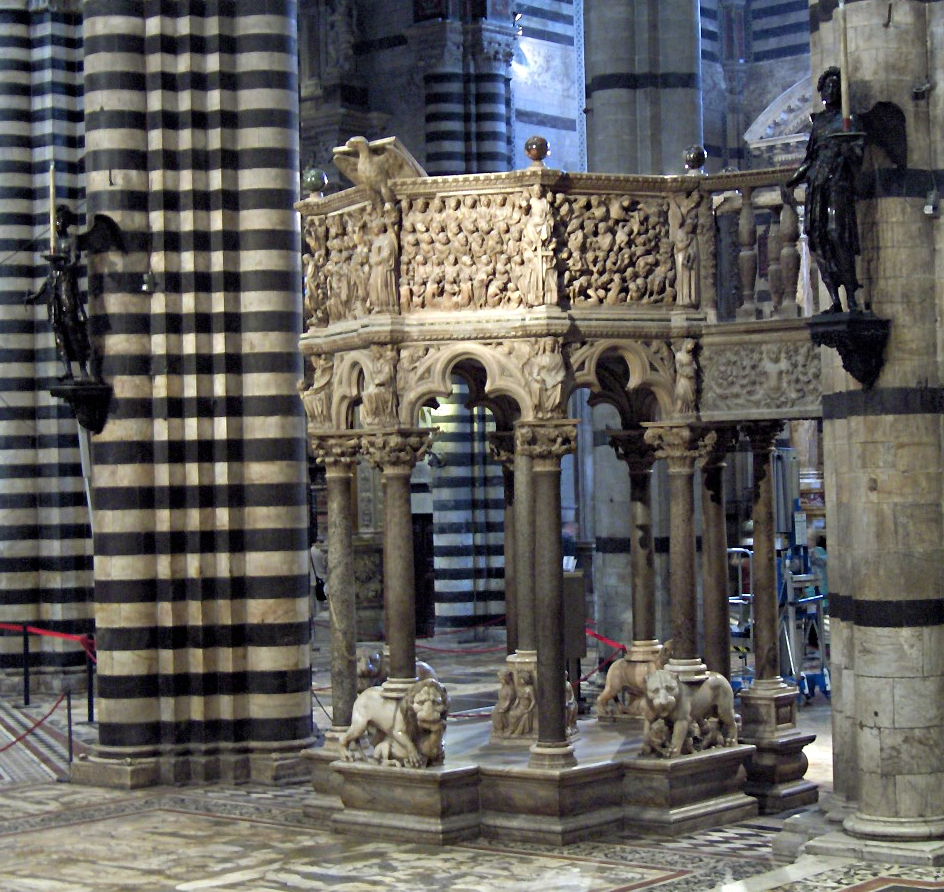
Siena Cathedral Pulpit

The pulpit itself is octagonal and it has a central column on a pedestal that is encircled with the carved figures of ‘Philosophy’ and the ‘Seven Liberal Arts’. There are eight outer columns made of granite, porphyry and green marble that are "supported alternately, like the Pisa pulpit on flat bases and lions." On the Panels, there are carved reliefs that "represent a Christological cycle from the Visitation to the Last Judgment. An aspect of these panels is that each one shows more than one subject, whereas, the Last Judgment is told in the space of two reliefs. The panels of this monumental pulpit share the same compression style of the Late Antique and Roman sarcophagi. In between each of the panels on the corner sections Nicola chose to include Christian symbols to help make the story line of the panels to flow more effortlessly. The many figures in each scene with their chiaroscuro effect show a richness of surface, motion and narrative.

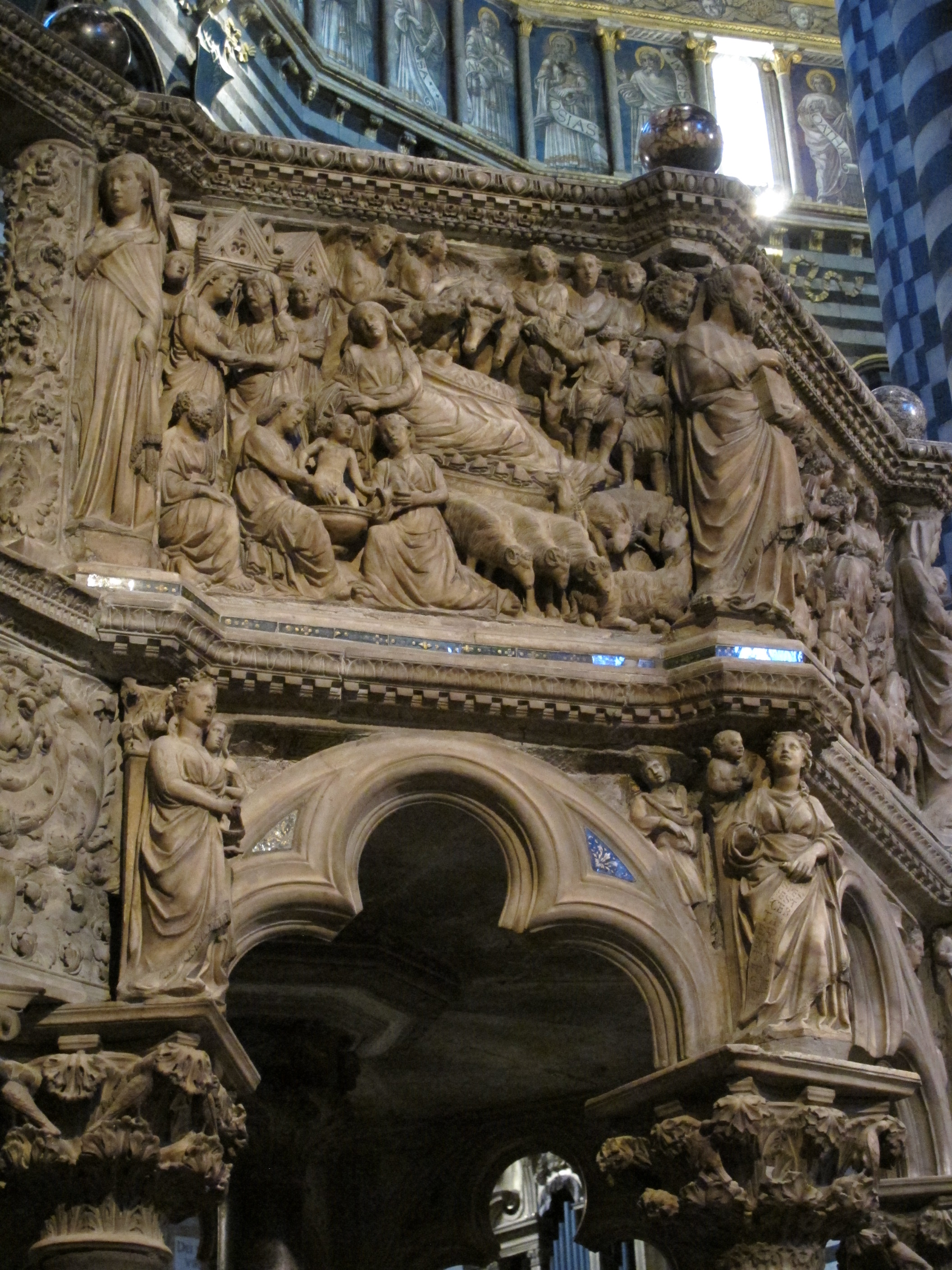
Visitation and Nativity

Seven scenes of narrative relief on the parapet show parts of the Life of Christ:

- Visitation and Nativity
- Journey and Adoration of the Magi
- Presentation in the Temple and Flight into Egypt
- Massacre of the Innocents
- Crucifixion
- Last Judgment with the Blessed
- Last Judgment with the Damned

== The panels ==
The Visitation and the Nativity

"The Virgin Annuciate introduces the Visitation relief" In the first corner, on your left hand side there is the image of the Madonna with the announcing angel. To the right of that there are two women, who look like Roman matrons who clasp hands "enacting the visitation" Below them are two midwives washing the child, which may be the work of Arnolfo di Cambi. In the center of the relief, Mary lounges like a "classical goddess or empress" To the right of her the panel depicts the visiting shepherds, who "are dressed in Roman tunics, while their sheep, clustered around the Virgin’s bed, have surely strayed in from some Virgilian Pastoral, or from Jasons quest. At the Upper right, above the shepherds, intrudes the large head of a Roman Emperor, his beard and hair well-drilled in true lapidary fashion." Also on this panel one can see the French Gothic influence. Above the two Roman matrons emerges an image of a Gothic arch and "the character of this architecture, its relative elegance and thinness of proportions, suggests transalpine influence."

Journey and Adoration of the Magi

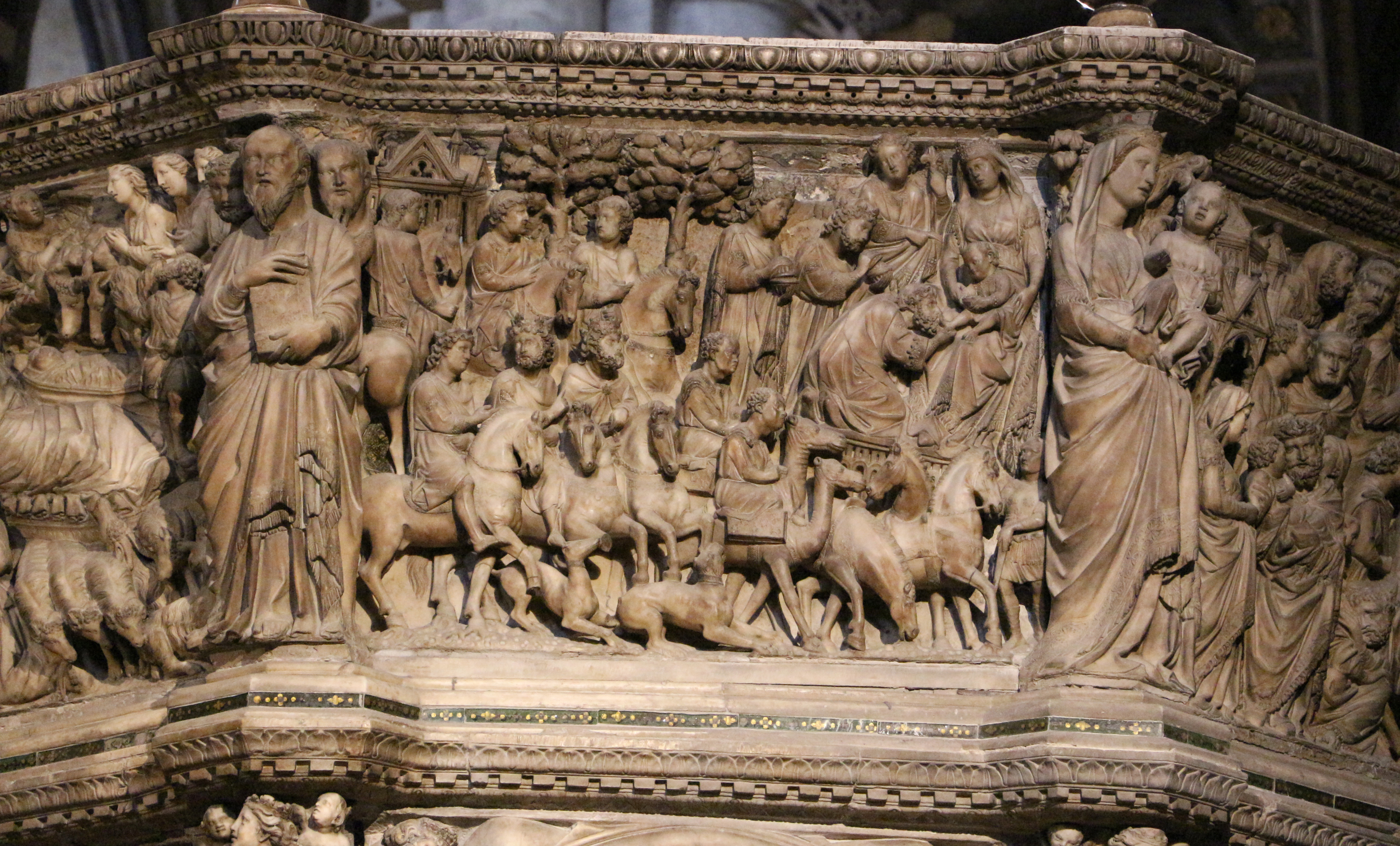
Journey and Adoration of the Magi

Between the images of the Shepherds visitation to Mary and the new born Jesus to the next panel containing the journey and adoration of the magi stands a carving of Isaiah; who was an 8th-century prophet The panels reliefs begin with horsemen riding in from the left with other animals, such as camels and dogs carved into the panel as well. Added with the flora sculpted above the magi, it can be seen that Nicola wanted to embrace naturalistic themes. The upper right hand corner holds the scene with Jesus being adored by the Magi while sitting on his mother's lap. The fold of the robes that each character wears and the S-shape pattern in the hair denotes Roman stylistic influence.

Presentation in the Temple and Flight into Egypt

An image of Mary holding the Christ child is the carving that separates The Adoration from the next panel containing the Presentation and then the Flight. The temple sits in the upper left hand corner presiding over the Toga cloaked figures below. The Style of the building is yet again Gothic which is juxtaposed with the Roman style characters of the panel. On the bottom of the left side there is the narrative of Mary and Joseph with baby Jesus meeting Simeon outside the temple. Then immediately to the right of these figures there is the carving of the Holy family fleeing to Egypt on the back of a mule.

Massacre of the Innocents

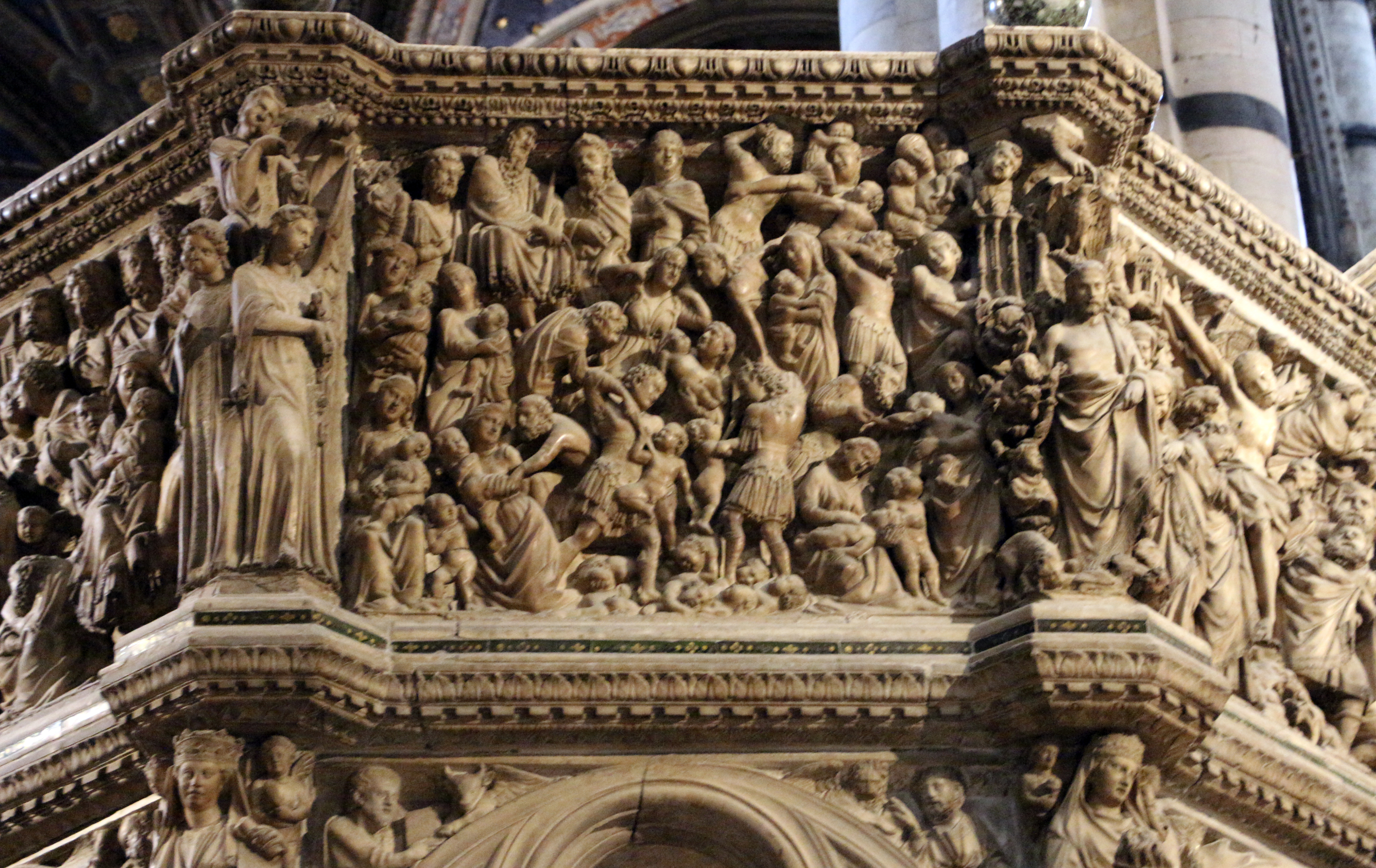
Massacre of the Innocents

Leading from the Flight into Egypt to the Fourth Panel of the Massacre there is the image of three angels. This relief is the one that takes central spot upon the pulpit. It is also the only panel that does not contain Jesus or his family, in fact it is concerned with the absence of Christ, because it depicts when King Herod decreed the mass killing of the baby boys in Bethlehem to avoid the prophecy that the "King of Jews" would take his throne. This panel is also a new addition to the tradition of pulpits. It cannot be found in Nicolas previous Pisa pulpit and it also differs from its predecessors by having 24 nude children rather than the common 3 or 4. This panel is a good example of Nicolas attention to emotion and movement. The struggle between the families clutching their children and the Roman soldiers (wearing traditional Roman uniform) is true classical form. With none of the characters arranged stiffly but rather lunging, shirking and squirming in the panel. It is said that with “the sharpened dramatic effects” that Giovanni Pisano may have had a hand in creating this relief.

Crucifixion

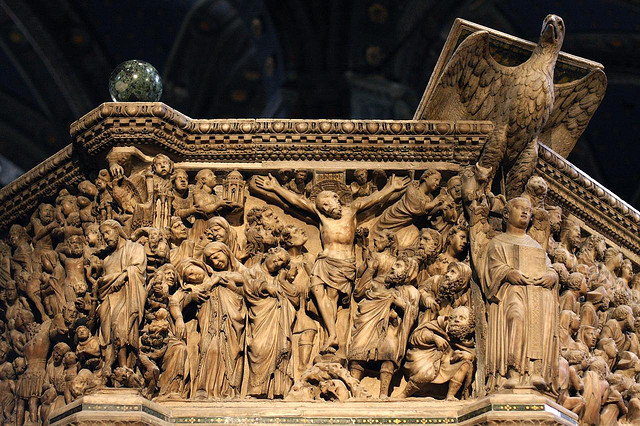
Crucifixion panel from the Siena Pulpit

To the right of the massacre, stands the image Jesus and the Four Evangelists. This carving introduces the next relief panel depicting the Crucifixion. In the center on the panel Jesus hangs upon the cross traditionally shown with his head falling to the side and modestly covered in a loin cloth. A new addition that Nicola made to the crucified Savior is the joining of Christ's feet upon the cross with one nail. This had not been seen before the 13th century. Surrounding Jesus is a scene of onlookers and mourners. To the left of Christ stands the image of Mary physically grieving. Her stance and emotion is another motif of the 13th century as it became common to depict the Virgin as swooning. This panel is also a good example of Nicolas understanding of depth with the foreground figures being the largest.

Last Judgment with the Blessed

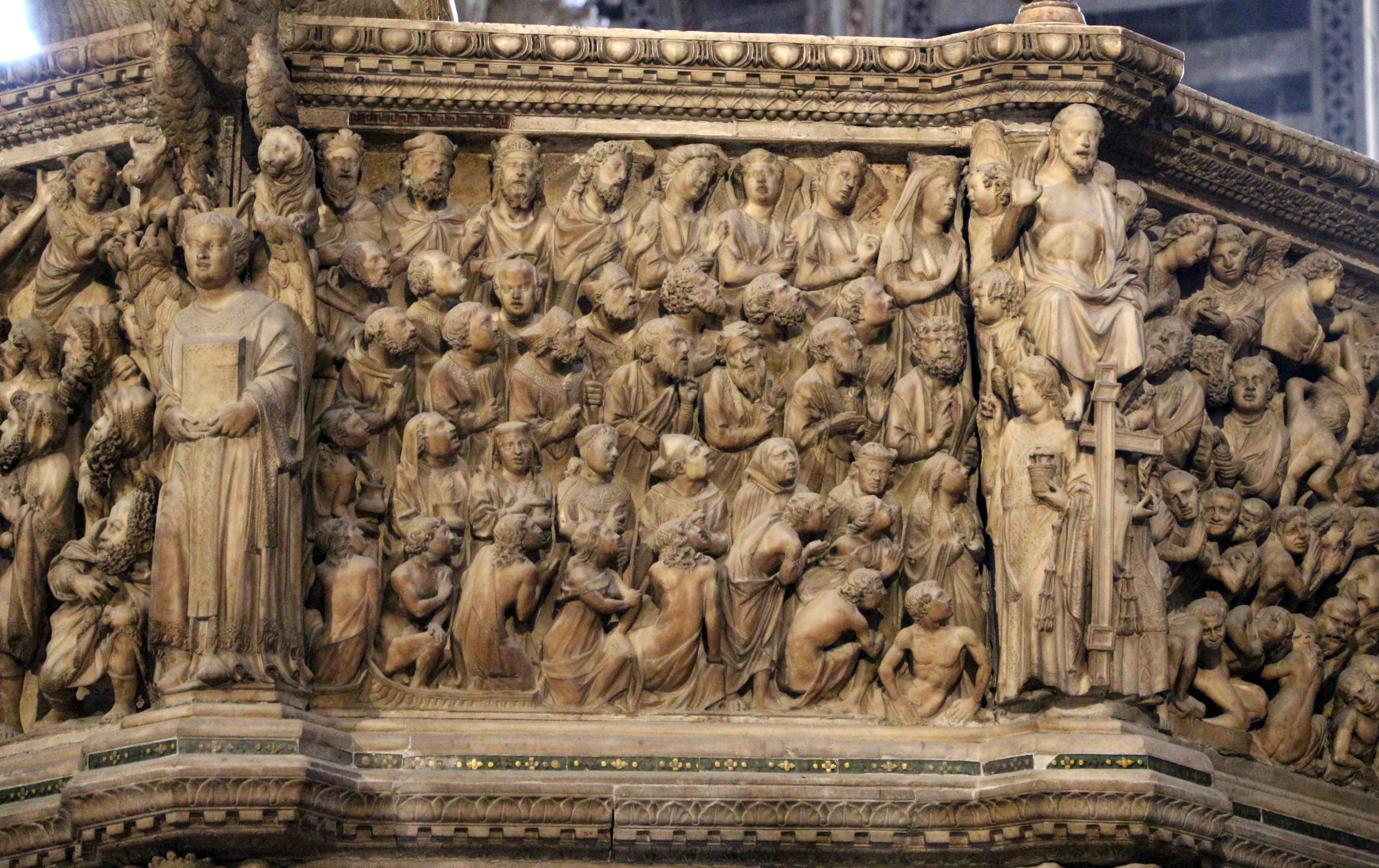
Last Judgment: the Blessed

The pulpit ends with two separate panels depicting the Final Judgment with Christ intersecting the Blessed and the Damned. Like in Pisa pulpit, these panels are also arranged in the amphitheatre style placing the figures in rows on top of one another. Each character in both reliefs is highly individualized almost done in portrait style. The figures of the saved in the panel on the left of Christ sit calmly, some looking up towards Jesus whereas on the right side of Christ the scene of the characters being pushed into Hell is much more chaotic and emotional. There are monsters and devils tearing at the characters and in the left hand corner there is an image of angels deciding who is to be damned. The pulpit ends its narrative sequence with a sculpture of "sad and dismayed angels sounding the bugles of destruction."

== The columns ==
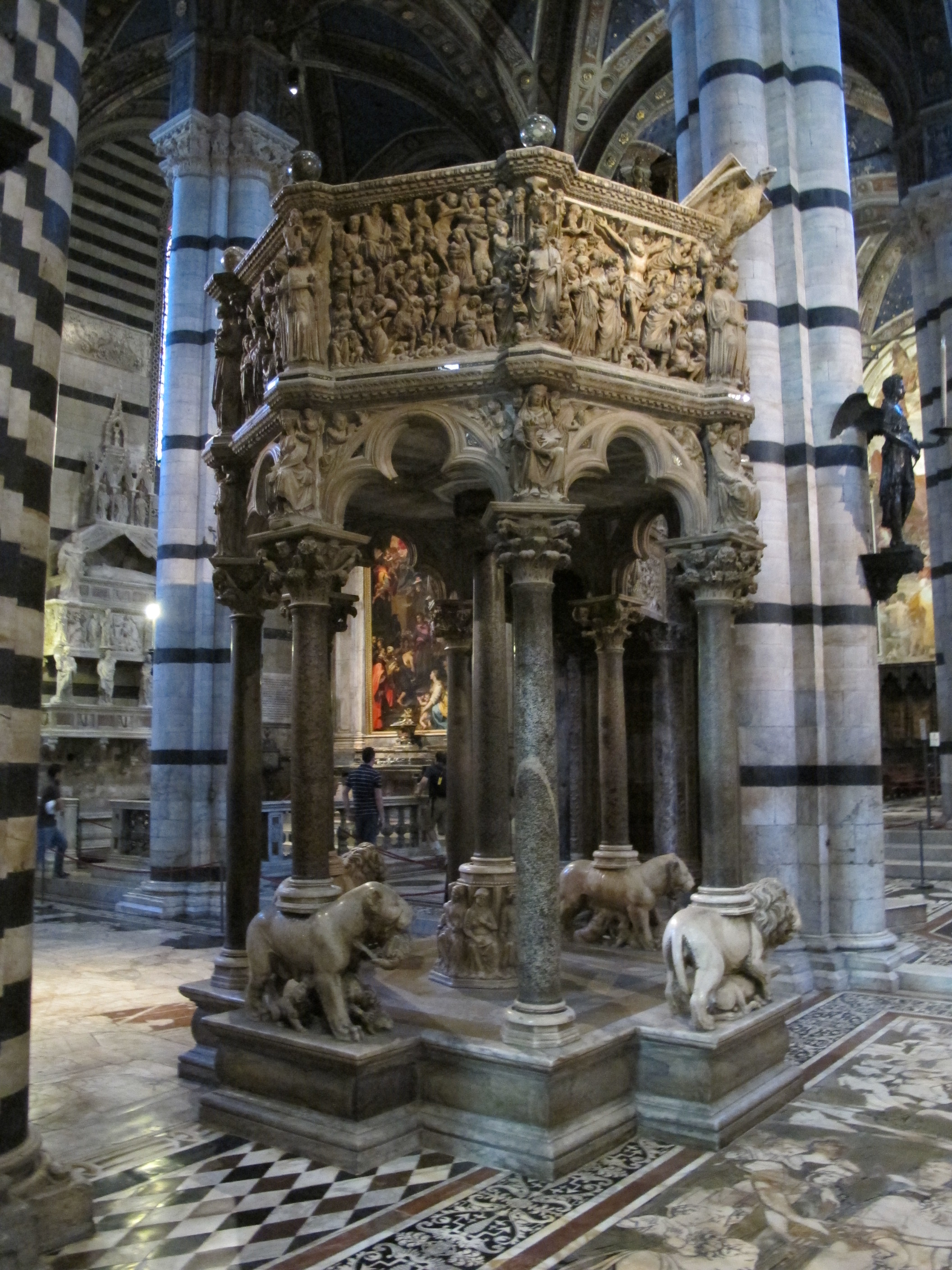
Siena Cathedral Pulpit with its seven columns

The central column ends in a large pedestal that is decorated with the representations of the Seven Liberal Arts and Philosophers.

- Grammar, as a young boy reading a book upon his lap
- Dialectica, as an old scholar with a wrinkled face
- Rhetoric, as a woman pointing to book
- Philosophy, as a woman dressed in richly adorned clothes and holding a torch
- Arithmetic, as a lady who is counting on her fingers
- Music, as a woman playing a cithara
- Astronomy, as a scholar holding an astrolabe (library book)

The outer columns that alternate between ending at a base or upon a lions back are examples of medieval traditions as are the tri-lobed arches. The ornate foliage qualities of the capitals are a gothic expansion on the traditional Corinthian capital The upper and lower cornices are equally richly carved.

== Additions after Pisano ==
The staircase dates from 1543 and was built by Bartolomeo Neroni. At the same time, the pulpit was moved from the choir to its present location. It was raised on a square base, with a rectangular base jutting out on each side
