= Hours of Jeanne d'Evreux =

Illuminated manuscript by Jean Pucelle

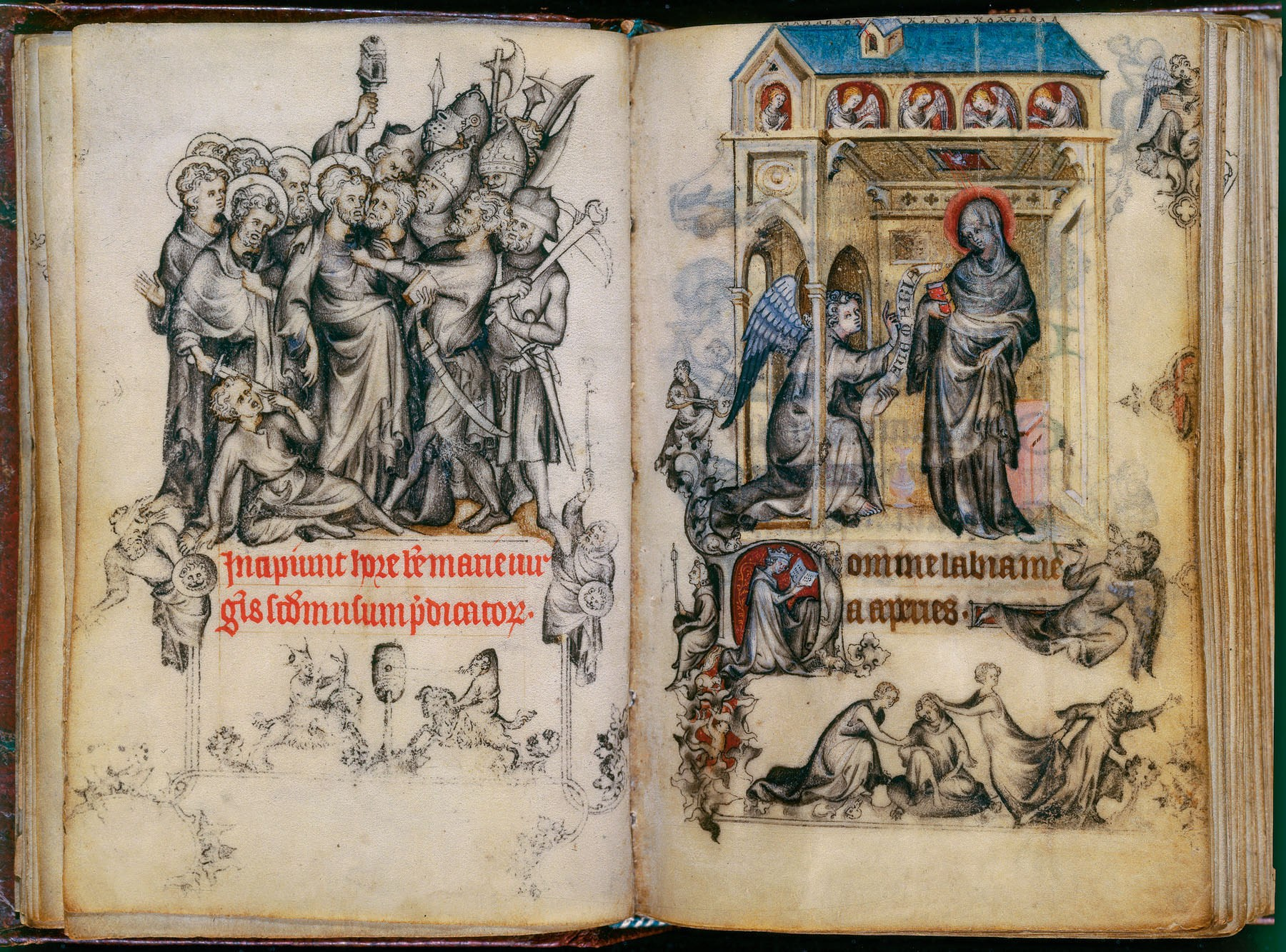
The Arrest of Christ and the Annunciation to Mary

The Hours of Jeanne d'Evreux is an illuminated book of hours in the Gothic style. According to the usual account, it was created between 1324 and 1328 by Jean Pucelle for Jeanne d'Evreux, the third wife of Charles IV of France. It was sold in 1954 to the Metropolitan Museum of Art in New York where it is now part of the collection held at The Cloisters (accession number 54.1.2), and usually on display.

The book is very lavishly decorated, mostly in grisaille drawings, and is a highly important example of an early royal book of hours, a type of book designed for the personal devotions of a wealthy lay-person, which was then less than a century old. It has been described as "the high point of Parisian court painting", showing "the unprecedentedly refined artistic tastes of the time".

== Description ==
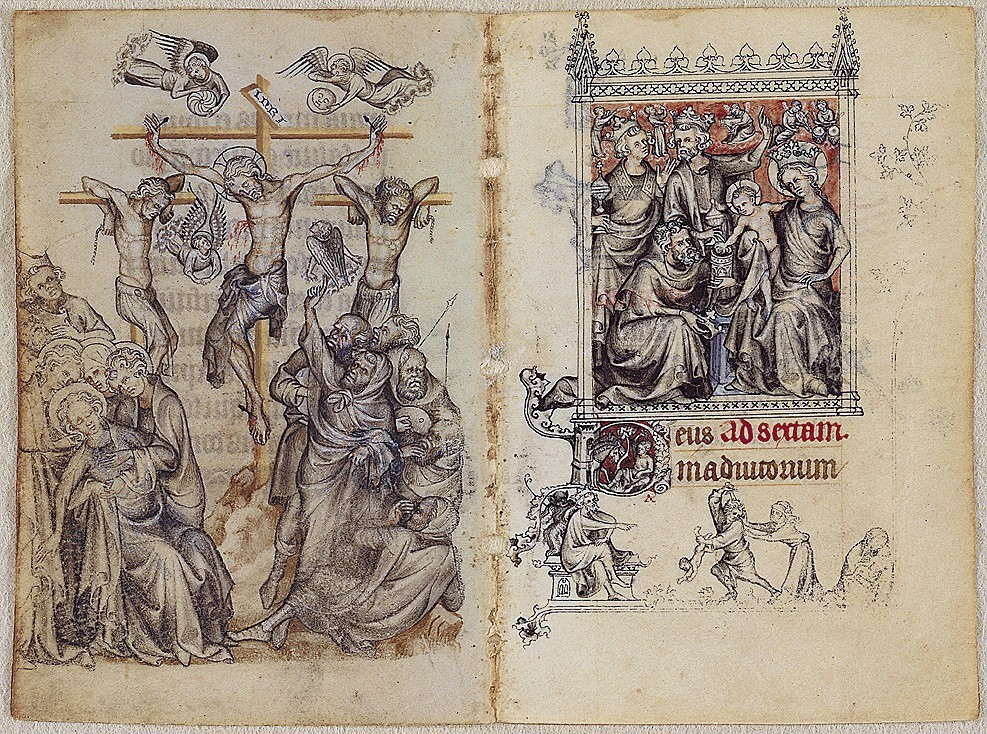
Crucifixion of Jesus and Adoration of the Magi

The book is very small: the size of each vellum folio or page is 3 5/8 x 2 7/16 in. (9.2 x 6.2 cm), and the overall size including the current replacement binding is 3 7/8 x 2 13/16 x 1 1/2 in. (9.9 x 7.2 x 3.8 cm). There are 209 folios, with 25 full page miniatures, but many other historiated initials and images in the borders of most pages, so that over 700 illustrations have been counted. Only ten folios have no decoration, just plain text, suggesting that the book was never entirely finished. The vellum is extremely thin, almost transparent, and the text by an unknown scribe is very finely written.

The miniatures use a variety of grisaille drawing in pen known (or at least so called in an inventory that included this work) as "de blanc et noir" and tempera for the other colours. Using both grisaille and colour together is a technique known as “camaïeu gris”. The full-page paintings include cycles of what are always the most commonly found phases of the Life of Christ, the Passion and Infancy. These illustrate the Hours of the Virgin, which is found in some other books of hours, but most unusually they are arranged on facing pages showing a scene from the Passion on the left and from the Infancy on the right, with eight pairs of scenes. However such an arrangement is often found in the ivory diptychs that were being produced in great numbers in Paris at this period. Another cycle shows nine scenes from the life of the Saint-King Louis IX of France decorating the office dedicated to him. Saint Louis was the great-grandfather of both Queen Jeanne and her husband Charles IV, who were first cousins.

The text is unusual in that the saints' days noted in the calendar, and those mentioned in the litany, are clearly those of Paris, featuring all the otherwise obscure local saints one would expect, such as Saint Cloud and Saint Germain. However the rest of the text follows forms typical of hours written for members of the Dominican order. It is possible that two different models were accidentally used by the scribes, though this seems somewhat careless in a major royal commission. But Queen Jeanne was especially close to the Dominicans, so the mixture of texts may be deliberate. Various mistakes in other parts of the book are corrected, which for appearance's sake they often are not in luxury books, but the calendar has no corrections, despite misspelling over 30 saints' names, and giving 15 the wrong feast days.

== History and authorship ==
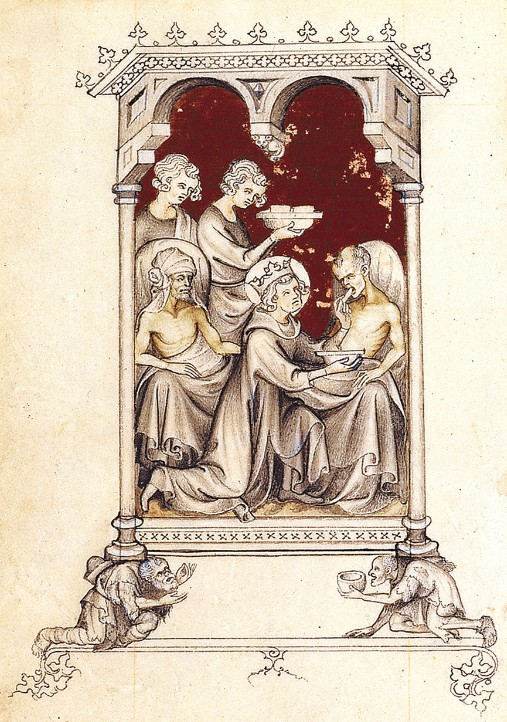
Saint Louis caring for victims of the plague

Although there are dissenting opinions, the book is generally believed to be the work of the leading Parisian illuminator, Jean Pucelle (or Jehan Pucele). It is usually identified with the book mentioned by Queen Jeanne in her will, in which she leaves to Charles V "un bien petit livret d'oroisons que le roy Charles, dont Dieu l'ame, avoit faict faire pour Madame, que pucelle enlumina" ("a very small prayer book which King Charles, may God protect him, had made for Madame, which Pucelle illuminated"). The identification of the patrons, illuminator and the date assigned to the work all largely depend on identifying this book with the manuscript in New York, as does any clear conception of what Pucelle's personal style was. However this refers to a prayer book not a book of hours, and it has been doubted that this imprecision would have been likely in such a context. In addition none of Jeanne's heraldry appears in the book, unlike two other royal manuscripts made when she was queen, her Coronation Book and a breviary.

On the conventional assumptions, the book was first owned by Queen Jeanne until her death in 1371, when it was left to the then king Charles V. In 1380, an inventory of Charles V's possessions mentions a Dominican Book of Hours that had belonged to Jeanne d’Evreux. This book is assumed to be one mentioned in an inventory from 1401-2 of the books of John, Duke of Berry, who inherited many manuscripts from his brother's collection. There the description matches the present book more closely than that in Queen Jeanne's will: "Item une petites heures de Nostre Dame, nommée Heures de Pucelle, enlumées de blanc et de noir, à la usaige des Prescheurs" ("Item: a little hours of Our Lady, called the Hours of Pucelle, illuminated in black and white, in the Dominican usage"). If they are the same, between the inventories of Charles and Berry, the cover of the illuminated manuscript changed from a pearl-studded cover to a blue silk binding in 1402. Its whereabouts are then unknown until it reappears in the 17th century, as the two coats-of-arms on the current leather bookbinding make it clear that it belonged to the French noble Louis-Jules de Châtelet and his wife Christine de Gleseneuve Bar, who married in 1618 and both died before 1672.

The book then lacks a history until Alphonse de Rothschild of Geneva acquired it in the 19th century. At his death in 1900, it was left to his nephew Maurice de Rothschild in Paris. The Germans confiscated the book in 1940 during the occupation of France and sent it to Neuschwanstein castle in Germany. It was restored to its owner in 1948 and Maurice de Rothschild sold it in 1954 to the Metropolitan Museum of Art.

=== Pucelle ===
There are several different manuscripts thought to be illuminated by Pucelle and his workshop, but they show some discrepancies with regards to his style. Florens Deuchler, who was the chairman of Medieval Art and The Cloisters of the Metropolitan Museum of Art from 1968 to 1972, was very sceptical about attributing The Hours of Jeanne d’Evreux to Jean Pucelle, as was Elizabeth Flinn of the MMA. In an article called Jean Pucelle- Facts and Fictions he says: "we call him Jean Pucelle, although we do not know who he was, whether he worked as a chef d’atelier – the master of a workshop- or whether he was just an enlumineur we hear of by chance more often than we hear of his many colleagues working in Paris." There are a few other works that are claimed to be produced by the hand of Jean Pucelle, such as the Prayer Book of Bonne of Luxembourg, also located in the Metropolitan Museum of Art at The Cloisters, and the Belleville Breviary, that vary in style and quality. Karen Gould states: “Pucelle is believed to have painted the entire manuscript [the Hours of Jeanne d’Evreux].” Kathleen Morand is quite certain that “it [Hours of Jeanne d’Evreux] is also the only manuscript which we are certain was entirely executed by the hand of Pucelle.” Manuscripts such as the Prayer Book of Bonne of Luxembourg, are considered to be in the Pucelle style rather than by the master himself, while the Hours of Jeanne d’Evreux is thought to be by the master himself. The Metropolitan website currently uses the conventional attribution without any question marks indicating uncertainty. If the book was not commissioned for Queen Jeanne, it is highly likely to have been commissioned for another queen of the House of Capet, given the emphasis on Saint Louis and the crowned female donor portraits in the book.

== Commission ==
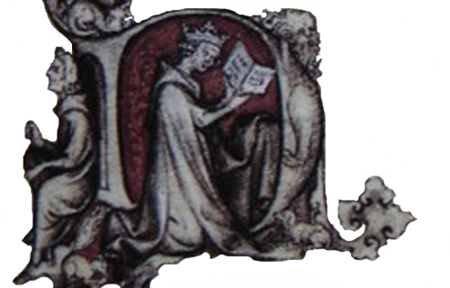
Donor portrait of Jeanne d'Evreux; detail of the Annunciation miniature

Charles IV married Jeanne in 1325 and died in 1328, giving the dating for the book (Jeanne lived on for over 40 years, until 1371); it may have been a gift for the wedding or her coronation. The Hours were made for her private use, to provide a text for the daily prayers she would read or recite at intervals throughout the day. It is thought that Jean Pucelle was a member of the royal court workshop, working for Charles IV, and he was perhaps an Italian or at least had travelled to Italy, to judge by some elements of his work, including the Hours of Jeanne d’Evreux. Deuchler states: "with the appearance of Pucelle’s name, there was an exciting new departure in Parisian courtly book illumination, which, as a matter of fact, would not have been possible without the contribution of Italy- to be more specific, without the aid of Duccio. The “Pucelle Style” shows solid trecento connections in its painterly skill and its familiarity with southern perspective as it existed in Sienese models." Pucelle seems to have been the originator of the Italian influence in French manuscript illumination, and after his death, the Italian influence in Parisian art disappeared. Paintings by Duccio, especially the Maestà in Siena Cathedral and the Pulpit by Giovanni Pisano in Sant'Andrea, Pistoia can be directly related to elements of The Hours of Jeanne d’Evreux. Strasbourg Cathedral and its sculpture was also an influence on the book, as in the Passion Cycle, where specific details from the sculpture of the cathedral are borrowed by the manuscript.

== Style ==
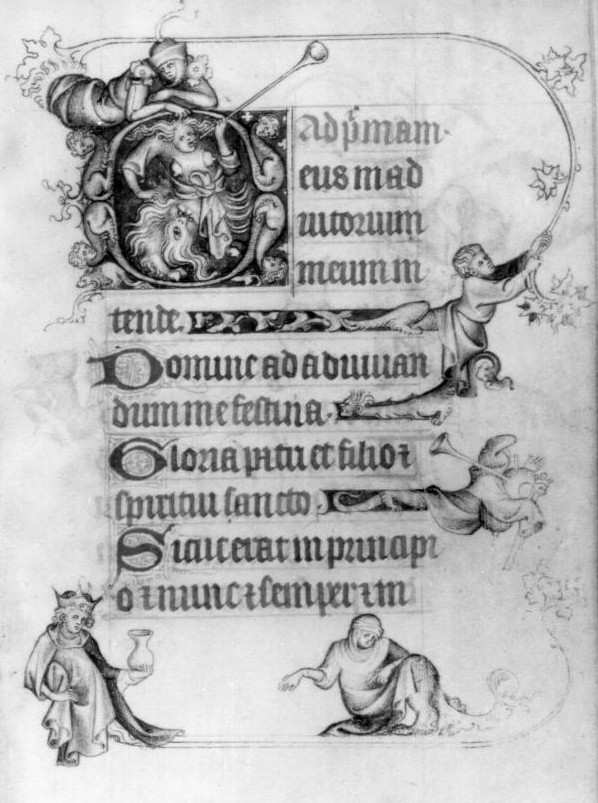
Text page

The hours are a classic masterpiece of Gothic illumination, and the architectural surrounds to many images show typical French Gothic architecture of the period. Although it does not depict the typical flying buttresses and gargoyles most commonly associated with the Gothic period, the 154 verso leaf from the Hours of Jeanne d’Evreux titled The Miracle of the Breviary, a cathedral with Gothic architecture Elements such as the trefoils that can be found decorating the top part of the ornate roof are drawn in grisaille. Even more gothic aspects can be found in the two facing folios depicting Christ Carrying the Cross, on verso sixty one, and the Annunciation to the Shepherds (62 recto). The figures are constrained within a space that acts as a frame but resembles a Gothic cathedral or at least carries the same structural or architectural and stylistic elements. Quatrefoils, gargoyles, crockets are all elements that are most associated with the Gothic movement and can be found in both folios. To be more specific, the Hours of Jeanne d’Evreux, belongs to the stylistic conventions of the Northern Gothic tradition that was native to Jean Pucelle with which “he combined the elegance and refinement of the Parisian court style with the lively humour and observation of nature characteristic of northern France and Flanders” while influenced by the Italians.

Close similarities to the sculpture of Strasbourg Cathedral have been noted, and Pucelle may have had an involvement there. According to Gould, “most of the connections with the Strasbourg sculpture appear in the Hours of Jeanne d’Evreux. The parallels with the Strasbourg sculpture occur in the Passion cycle in the Hours of Jeanne d’Evreux. Several of the motifs come from the Passion cycle occupying the tympanum of the central portal at Strasbourg.” Although, the relationship between Strasbourg Cathedral's second register of the tympanum and the miniature of Christ Carrying the Cross is quite unnoticeable when initially examined, “ the outstretched arm reaching to support the Cross in the miniature makes a visual connection with an unusual motif in the same scene” of the second register. All of the figures can also be found in the Siena Maesta by Duccio, and Portail de la Calende at Rouen Cathedral. Other similarities, especially ones concerned with the Hedroit Legend that are found in the Hours of Jeanne d’Evreux, can also be seen in the Hours of Yolande of Flanders. The facial features of the man whose wife forges the nails for Christ's crucifixion at the request of Jews, are similar to the facial features of the crouching figure in the Christ Carrying the Cross (61 verso).

== Iconography ==
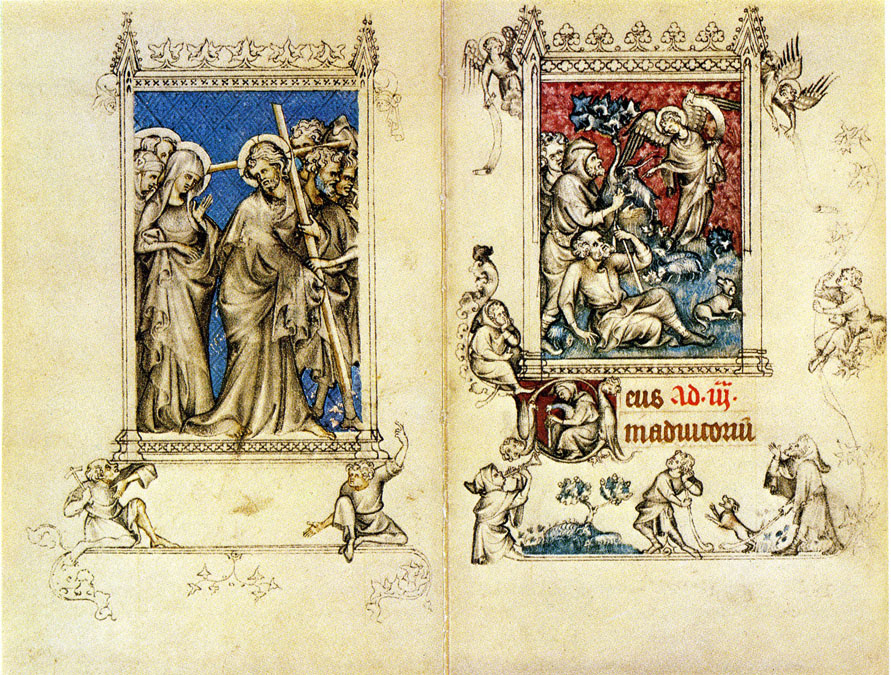
Christ Carrying the Cross and the Annunciation to the Shepherds

There are several iconographic features in the Hours of Jeanne d’Evreux that are worth mentioning. Portrayal of black Africans can be found at the beginning of the Passion cycle in two miniatures of the illuminated manuscript. The Passion cycle at Matins opens with the Betrayal, where Malchus, a crouching figure on the left side of the foreground, has features that ethnically differ from the rest of the figures in the image. Because by the time of Pucelle's artistic bloom, Europeans were well aware and familiar with North and East African races and appearances, “the idea of depicting blacks as servants and specifically as tormenters of Christ had become part of the visual iconography of Western art from at least the 12th century.” As the familiarity with black ethnicity heightened, so did the interest for realism, especially in the visual arts, which allowed for the depiction of characteristic features found in the specific African groups that have caught the attention of Western cultures at this point in time. The colour black is, traditionally, especially in Christianity, associated with sin and evil, which gave all the more reason and logic to depict Africans as the persecutors of Christ. “Although precedents for the depiction of Malchus as a black servant and of blacks persecuting Christ existed in Gothic art, in the early 14th century this iconography remained unusual.”

In the miniature of Christ Carrying the Cross (61 verso), from what appears to be outside of the frame [it's actually the arm of the man with the blue-tinted beard who is just behind and to Christ's left, as is obvious from the drapery], an arm reaches out to support the cross Christ is carrying at a diagonal angle. Connections can be made to the Hedroit Legend by comparing it to the Strasbourg tympanum where a woman, the wife of the smith who was asked to forge nails for Christ's crucifixion, is holding the three nails she forged while reaching out to support the Cross. Another aspect that exhibits Pucelle's familiarity with the Hedroit legend is the crouching figure on the left of the bas-de-page in Christ Carrying the Cross. The man is holding a hammer which can symbolize the nailing of Christ to the Cross, but it is also possible that the image is a reference to the husband of the woman who forged the nails for Christ's crucifixion, and now he is subjected to carrying all the weight of the guilt he is presented with caused by his wife's actions.

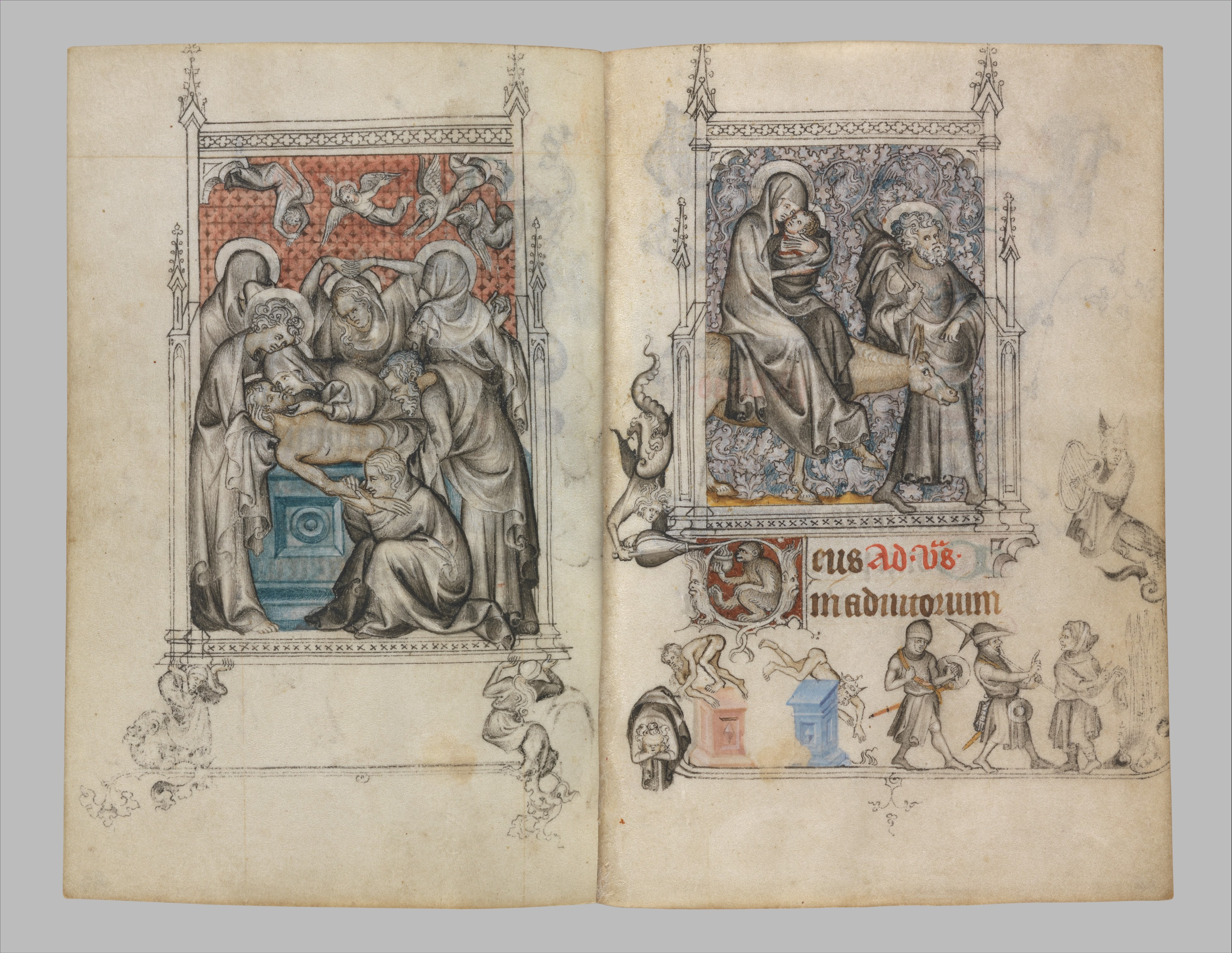
The Entombment of Christ and the Flight to Egypt

Folio 82 verso depicts the Entombment scene, which is heavily influenced by the Italian compositional approach while integrating Northern Gothic figures. A crouching figure, mourning Christ's death with outstretched arms that hold the arm of Christ, resides in the foreground of the Entombment miniature. The figure wears a heavy robe that “obscures the articulation of the body” and is positioned to the right of the central axis. Both her gaze and gesture supporting the limp arm of Christ “lead the eye from the foreground to the middle ground and to the focal point of the composition, the faces of Christ and the Virgin,” while relieving the horizontal line of Christ's recumbent body with her form. Judging from the foreground position, the fact that she is embracing Christ's arm, and her rippled hair exposed by the fallen hood of her cloak, all of which are “compositional and iconographic attributes in accordance with Mary Magdalene’s active role in the Lamentation found in the visual arts and devotional literature” the figure crouching in the foreground of the Entombment miniature is Mary Magdalene, of which the inclusion, according to Gerard Cames, is a Western innovation of the 12th century. The Annunciation page introduces a couple of compelling themes and symbols that are connected to the central miniature. On the outer bas-de-page margins, the musical angels and the animals, such as rabbits, ape, and squirrel, portrayed in the foreground “have an immediate relevance [to] minutely rendered allusions to fertility, the Fall of man, and Redemption”. The Betrayal page presents us with a mock-tilt composition and “two riders mounted on a goat and a ram (both beasts of multiple sinful connotation), [which] are engaged in a joint action of evil intent as they charge the keg set on a post between them”.

The Hours of Jeanne d’Evreux today is not in its full original 14th-century state, yet remains in excellent condition, apart from some damages, especially to the opening calendar pages. The scenes depicted in the two-bas-de-page facing pages at Matins, a mock tilt and a buffeting game were “rendered with great verve and skill, these scenes look simply like elaborate versions of the type of decoration customarily found at the beginning of devotional book at this period.”

== Gallery ==
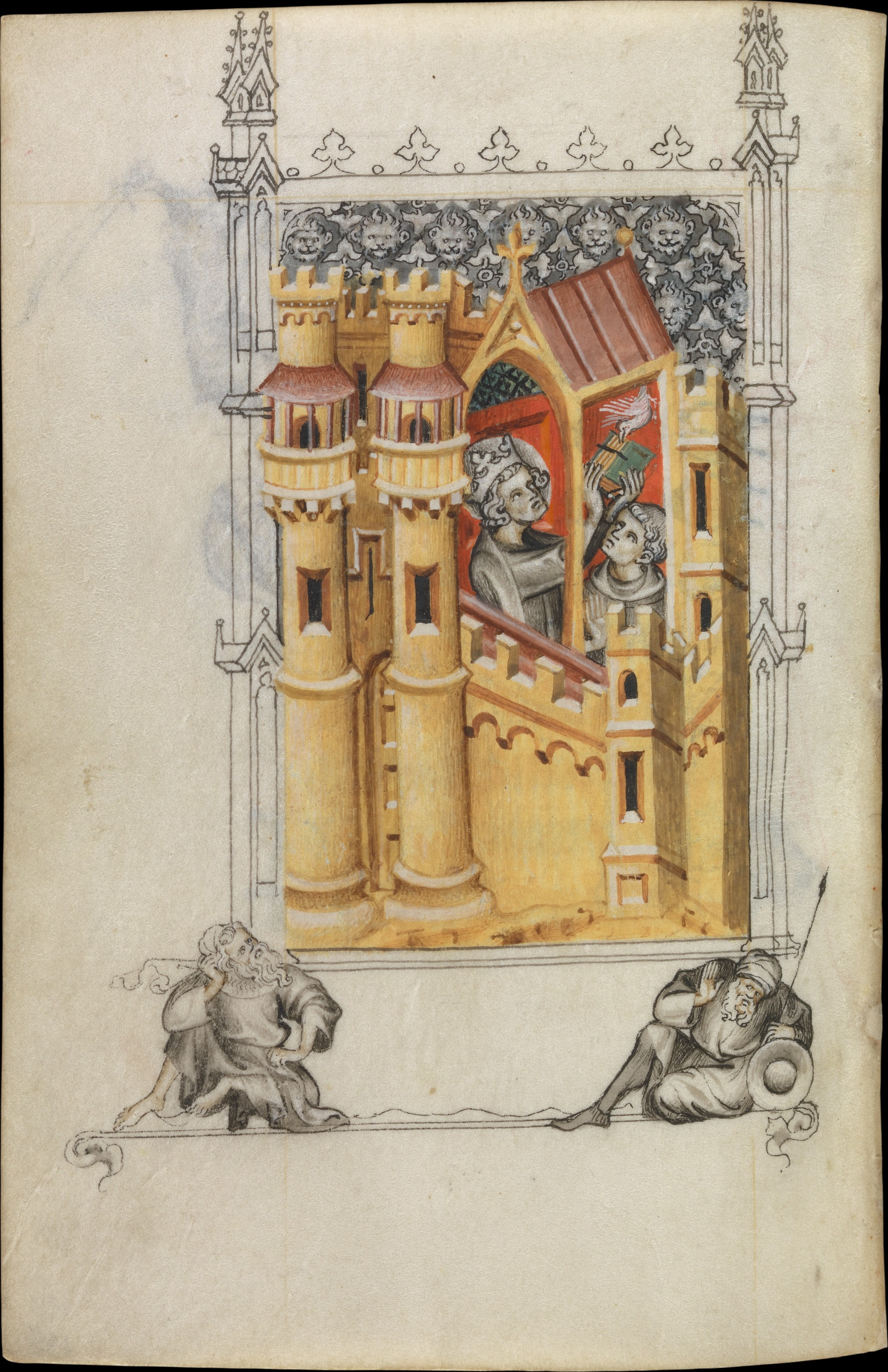

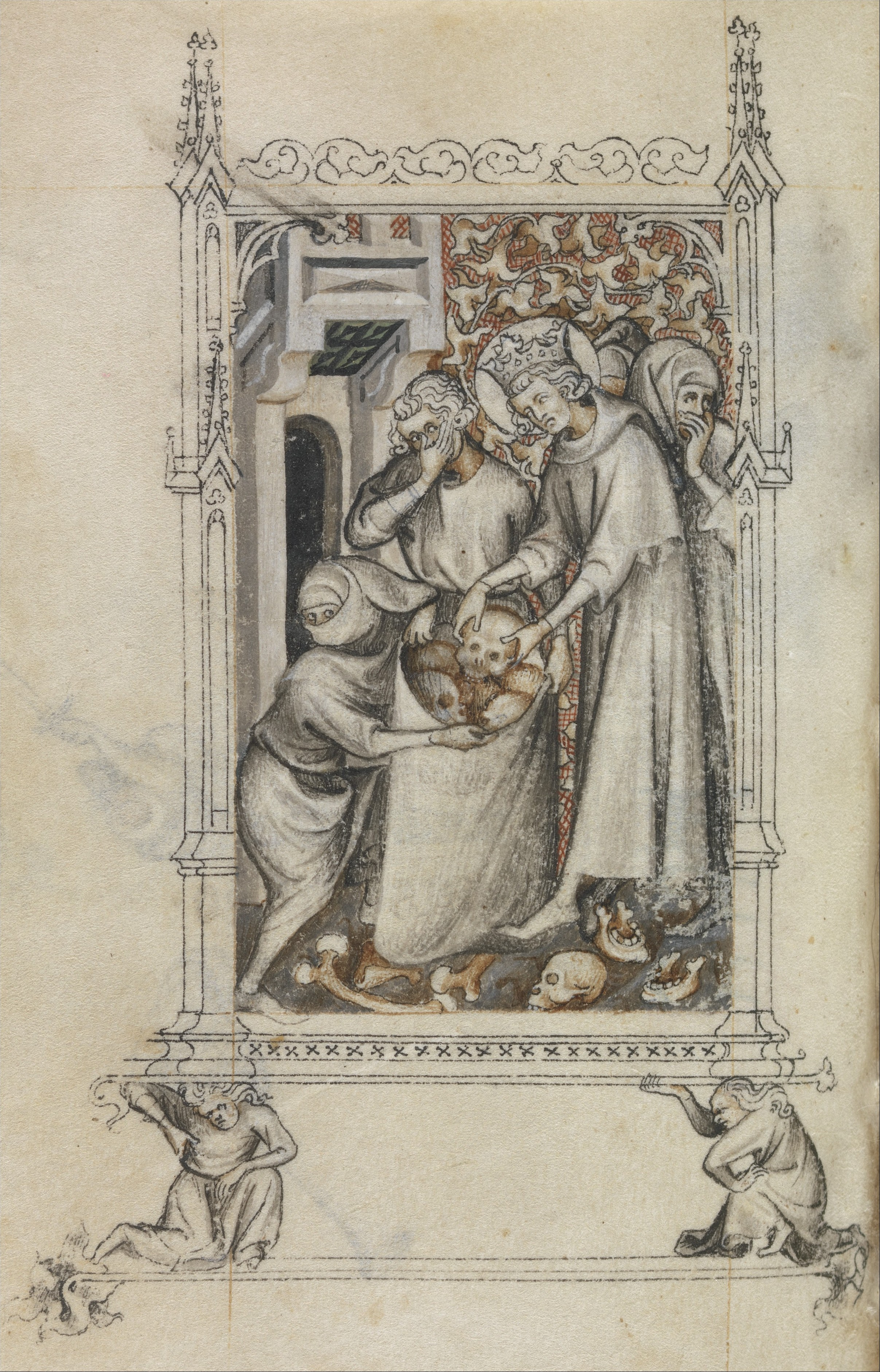

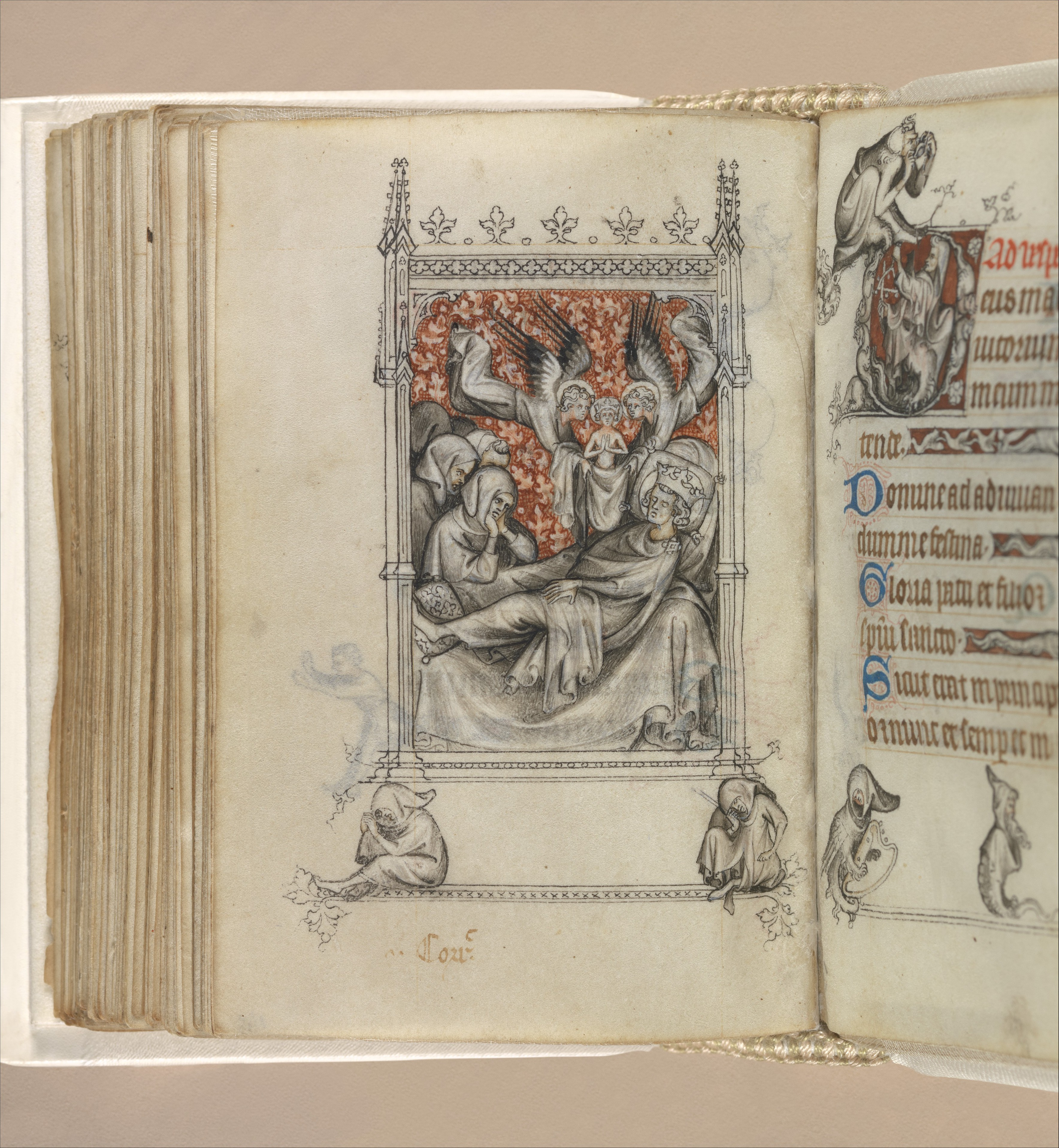

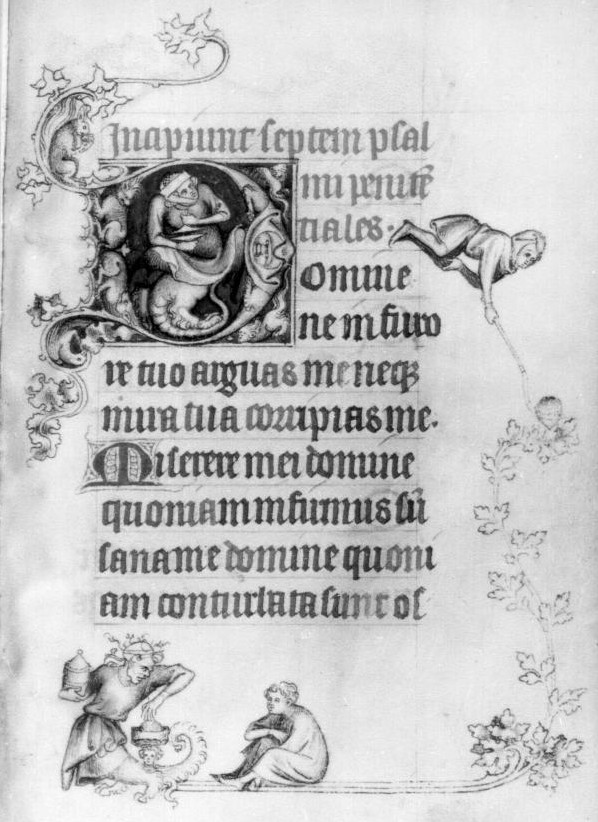

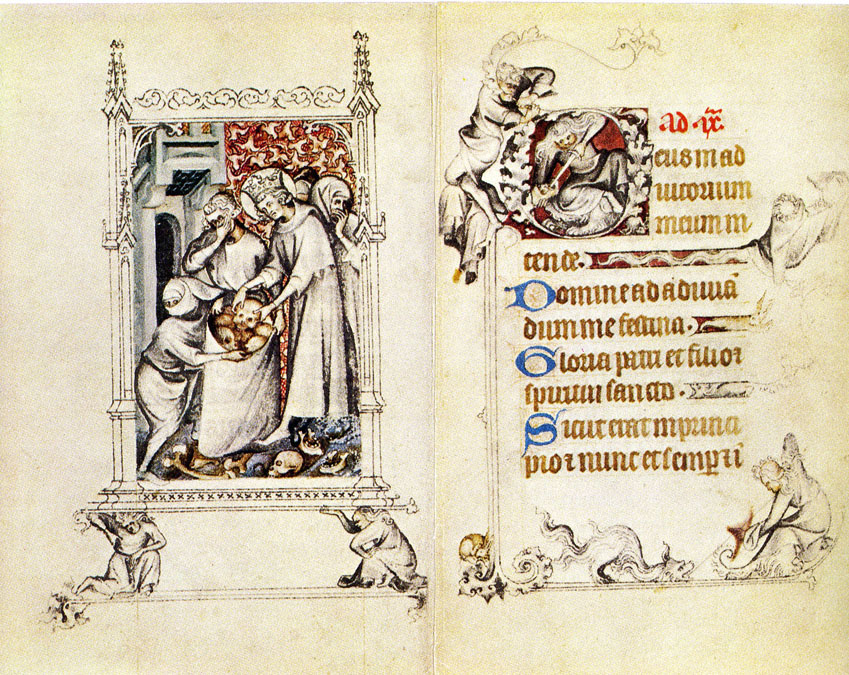

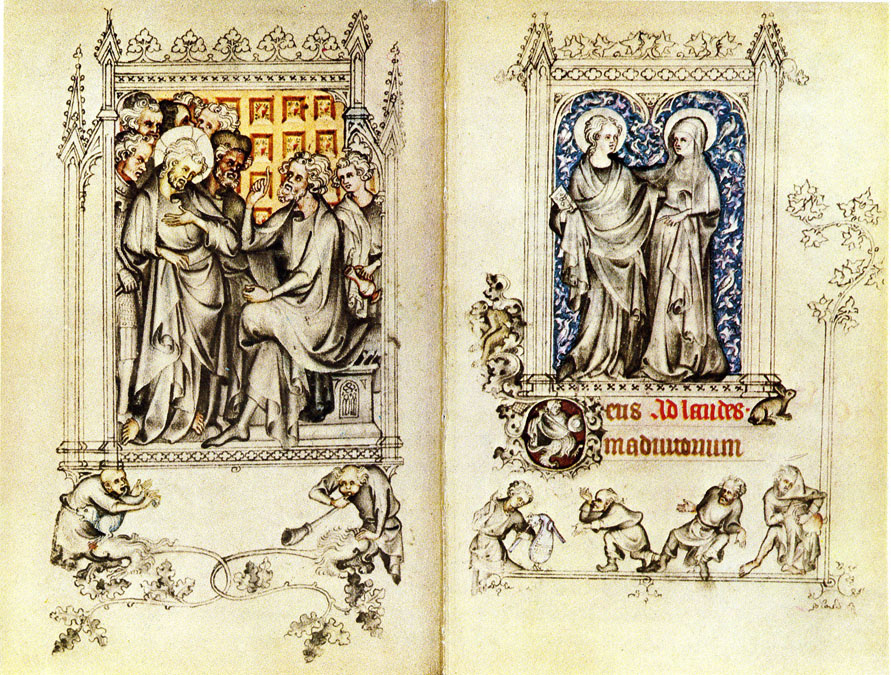

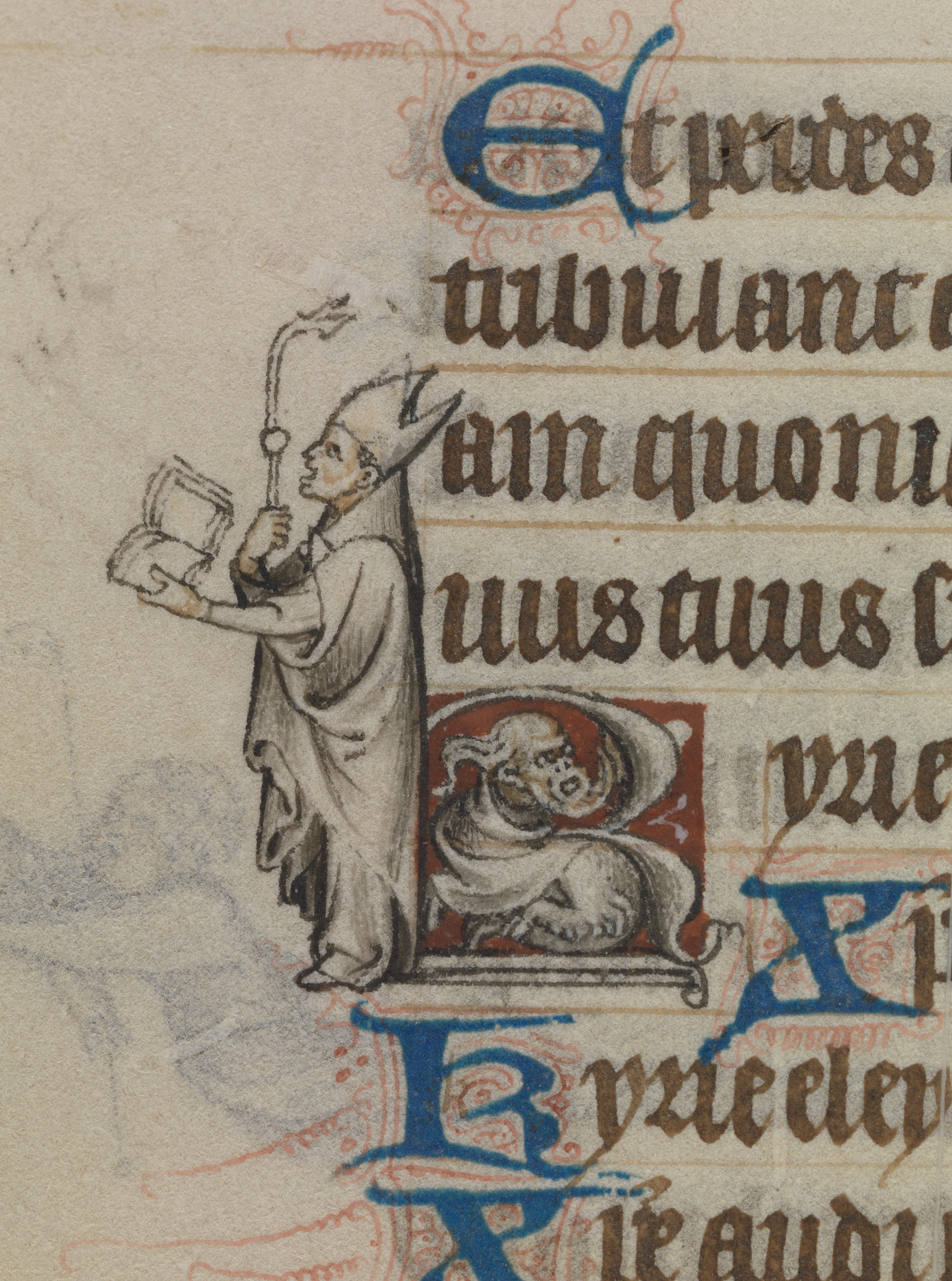

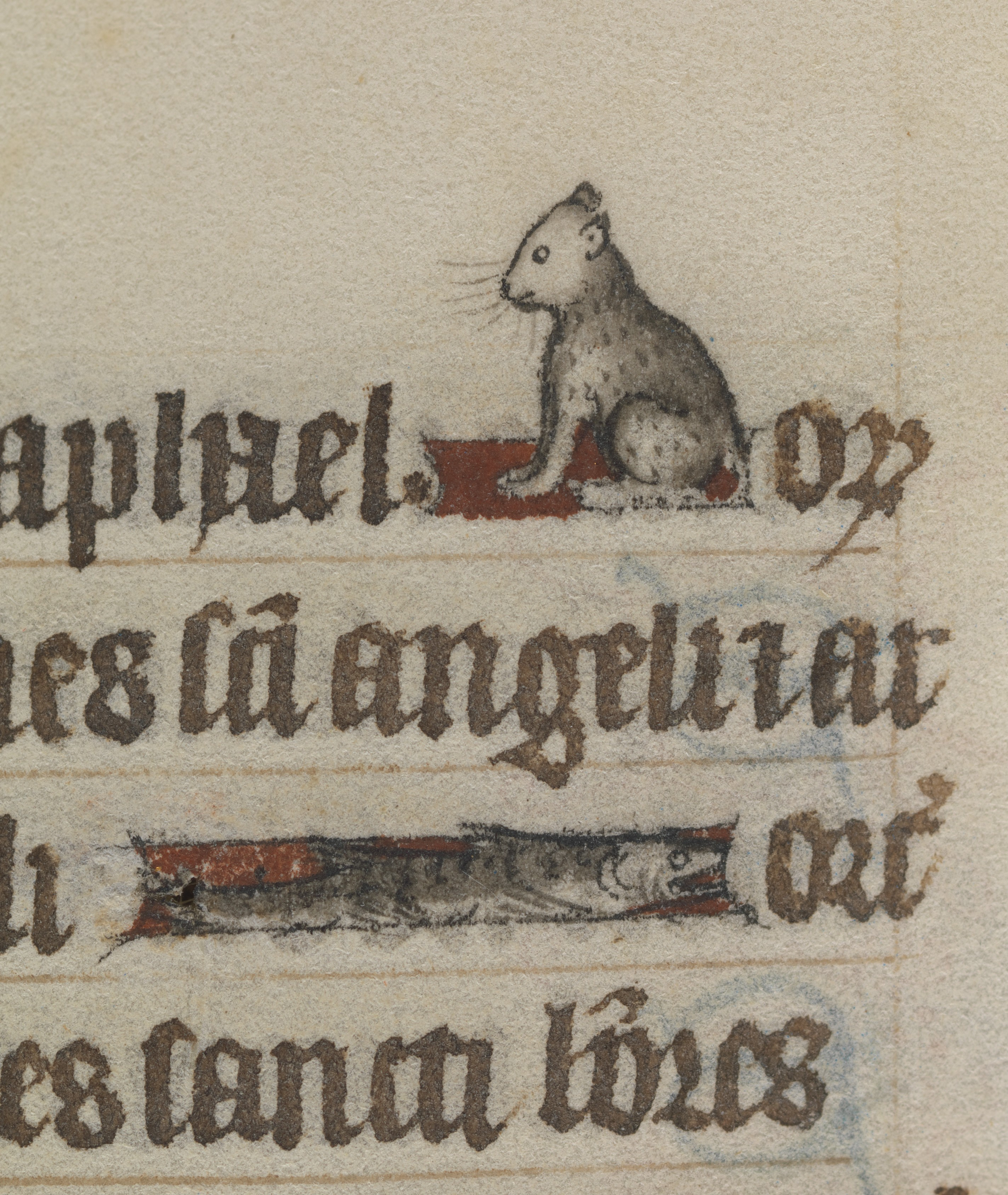

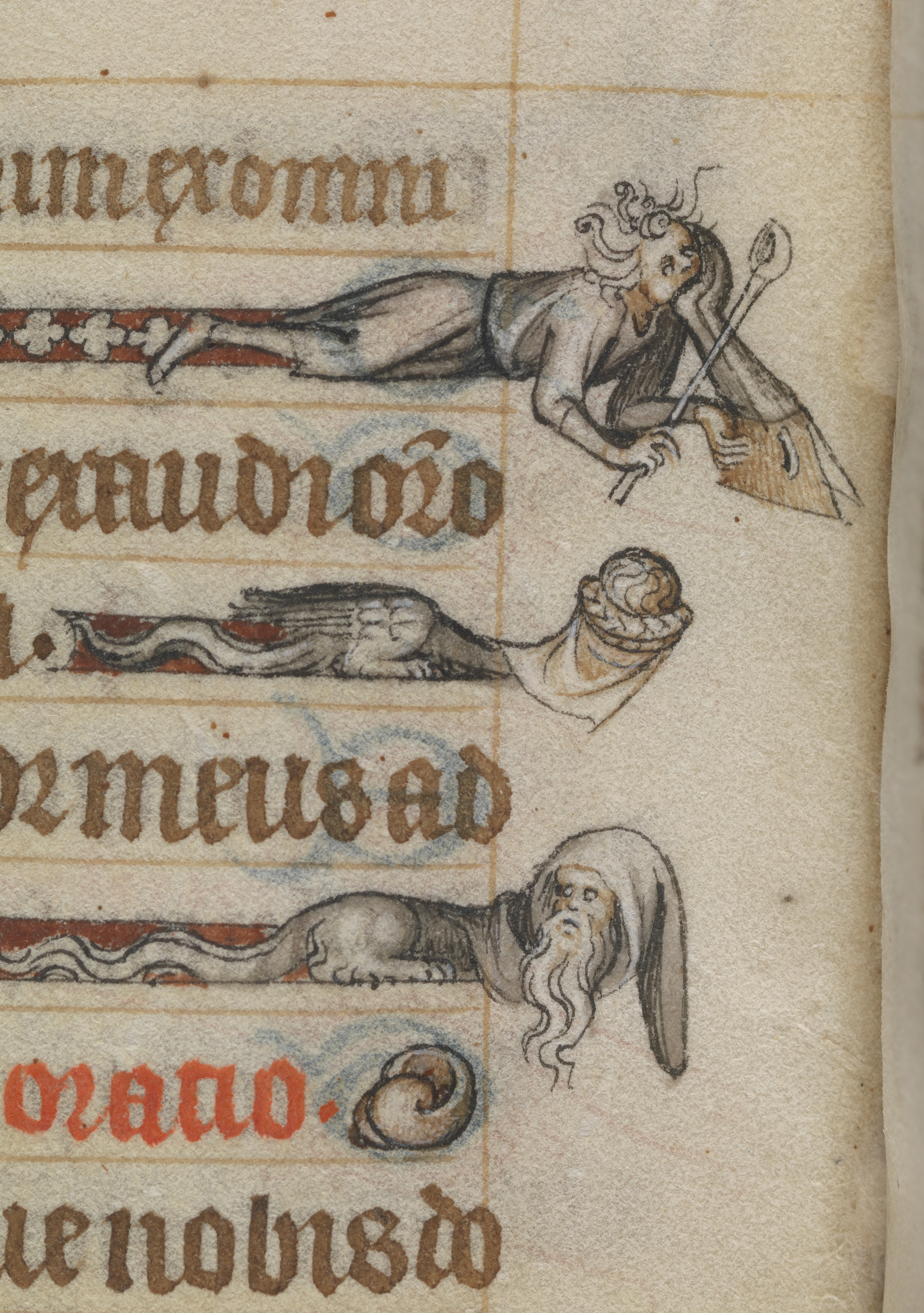
