= Gothic art =

Style of medieval art

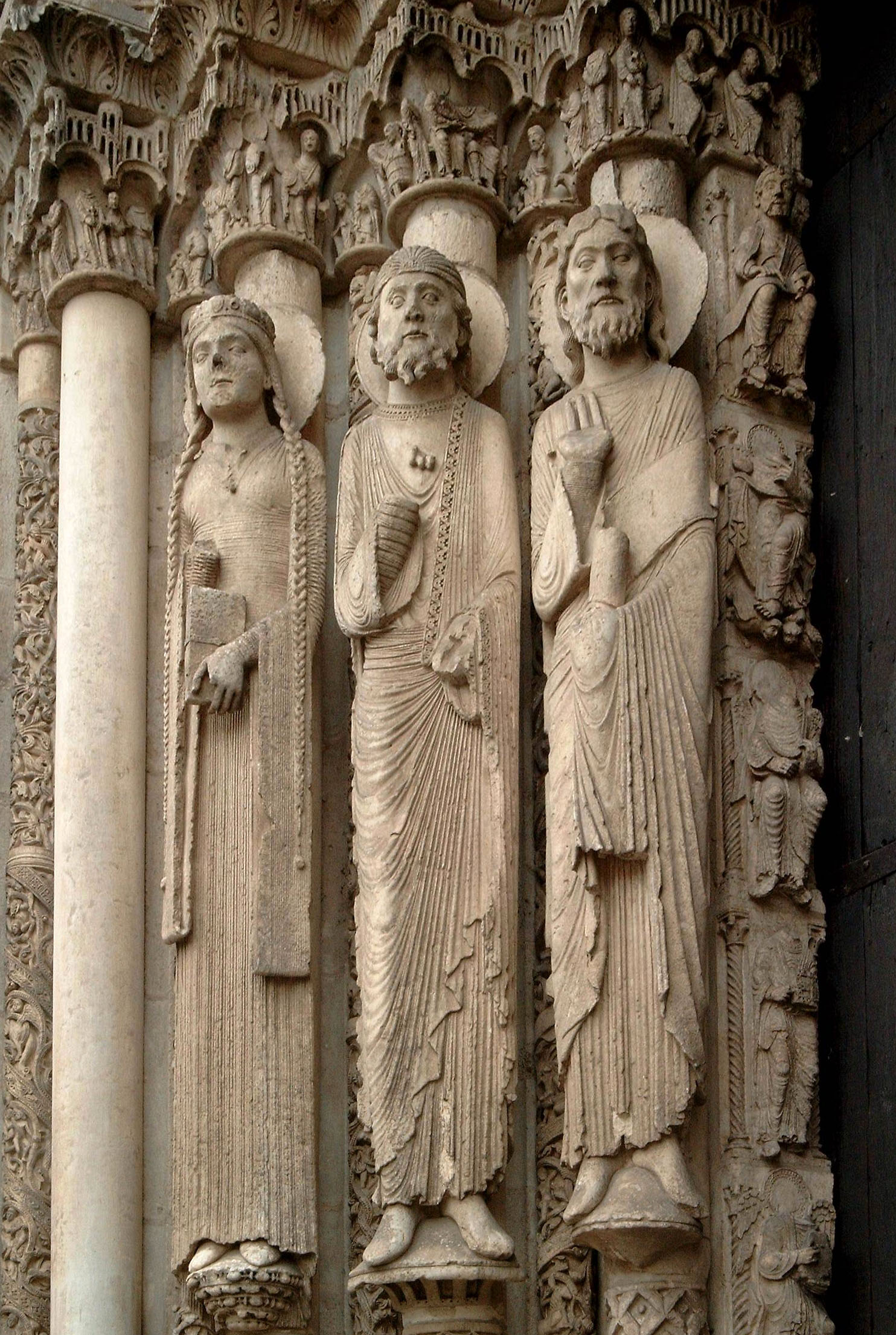
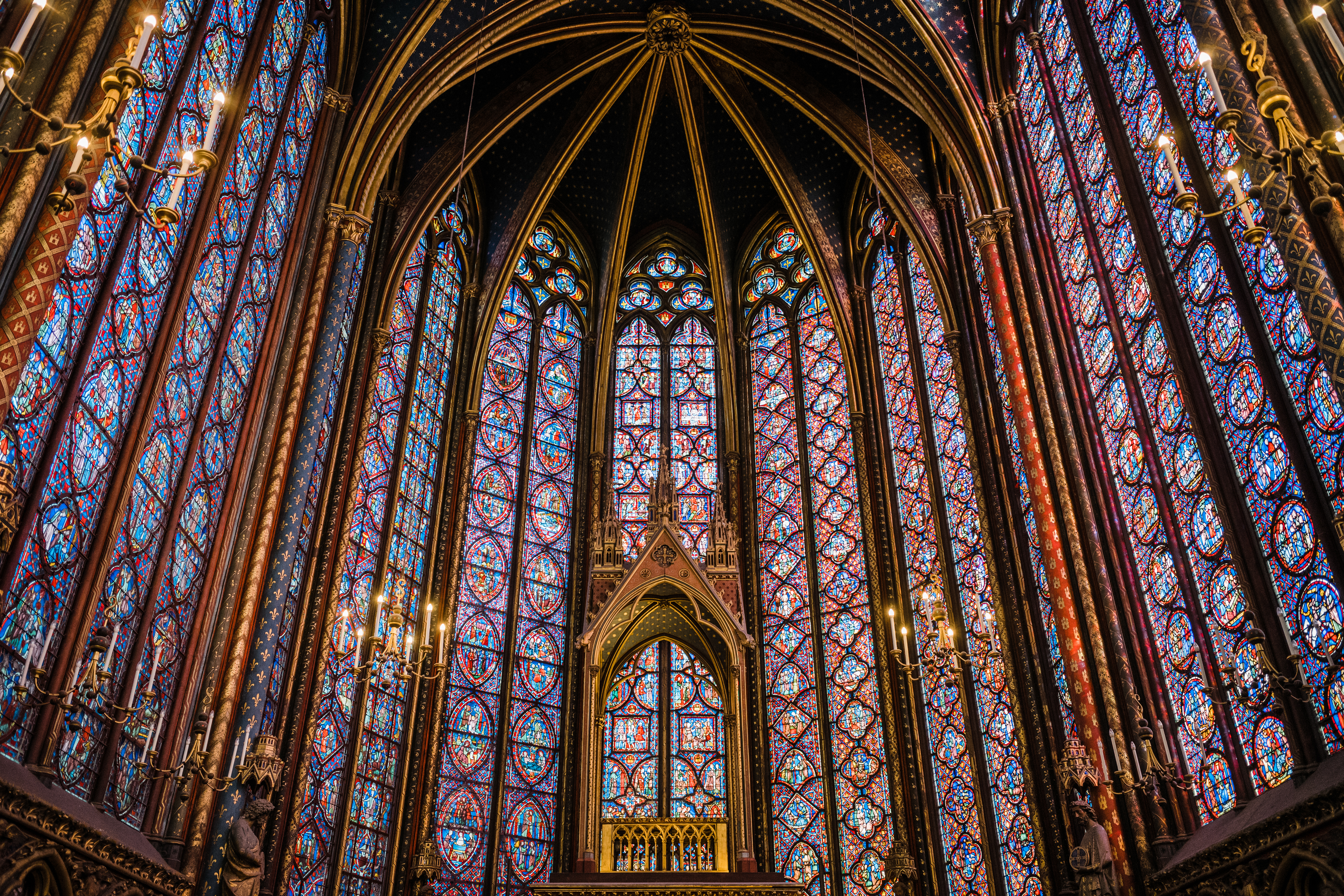
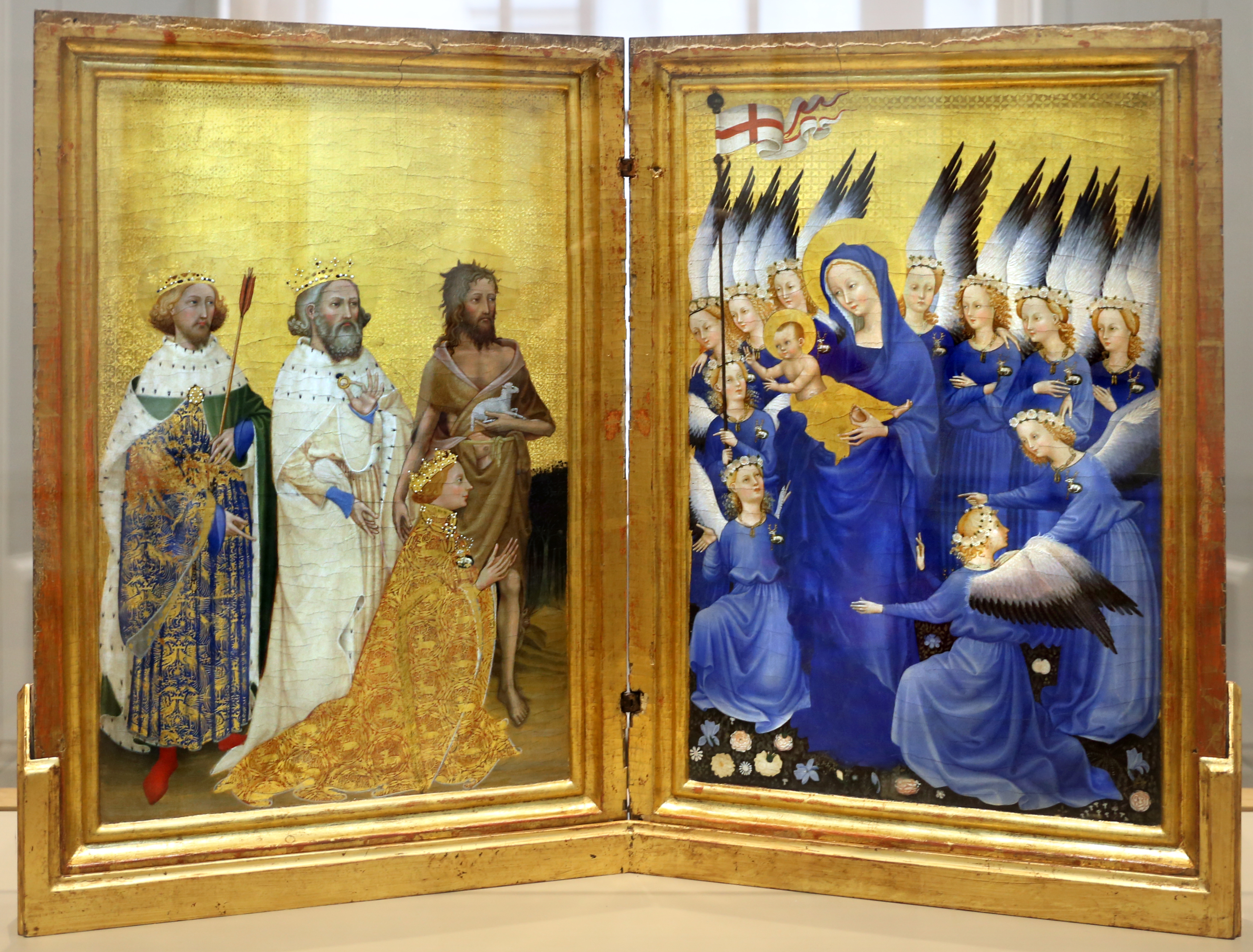
- Top: The Western (Royal) Portal of the Chartres Cathedral (c. 1145), these architectural statues being the earliest Gothic sculptures and a revolution in style and the model for a generation of sculptors; Centre: The Sainte-Chapelle from Paris (1194–1248); Bottom: The Wilton Diptych (1395–1459)

Additional media
- Years active: Late 12th century–16th century
- Location: Catholic Europe

Gothic art was a style of medieval art that developed in Northern France out of Romanesque art in the 12th century, led by the concurrent development of Gothic architecture. It spread to all of Western Europe, and much of Northern, Southern and Central Europe, never quite effacing more classical styles in Italy. In the late 14th century, the sophisticated court style of International Gothic developed, which continued to evolve until the late 15th century. In many areas, especially Germany, Late Gothic art continued well into the 16th century, before being subsumed into Renaissance art. Primary media in the Gothic period included sculpture, panel painting, stained glass, fresco and illuminated manuscripts. The easily recognisable shifts in architecture from Romanesque to Gothic, and Gothic to Renaissance styles, are typically used to define the periods in art in all media, although in many ways figurative art developed at a different pace.

The earliest Gothic art was monumental sculpture, on the walls of cathedrals and abbeys. Christian art was often typological in nature (see Medieval allegory), showing the stories of the New Testament and the Old Testament side by side. Saints' lives were often depicted. Images of the Virgin Mary changed from the Byzantine iconic form to a more human and affectionate mother, cuddling her infant, swaying from her hip, and showing the refined manners of a well-born aristocratic courtly lady.

Secular art came into its own during this period with the rise of cities, foundation of universities, increase in trade, the establishment of a money-based economy and the creation of a bourgeois class who could afford to patronise the arts and commission works, resulting in a proliferation of paintings and illuminated manuscripts. Increased literacy and a growing body of secular vernacular literature encouraged the representation of secular themes in art. With the growth of cities, trade guilds were formed and artists were often required to be members of a painters' guild. As a result, because of better record keeping, more artists are known to us by name in this period than any previous; some artists were even so bold as to sign their names.

== Origins ==
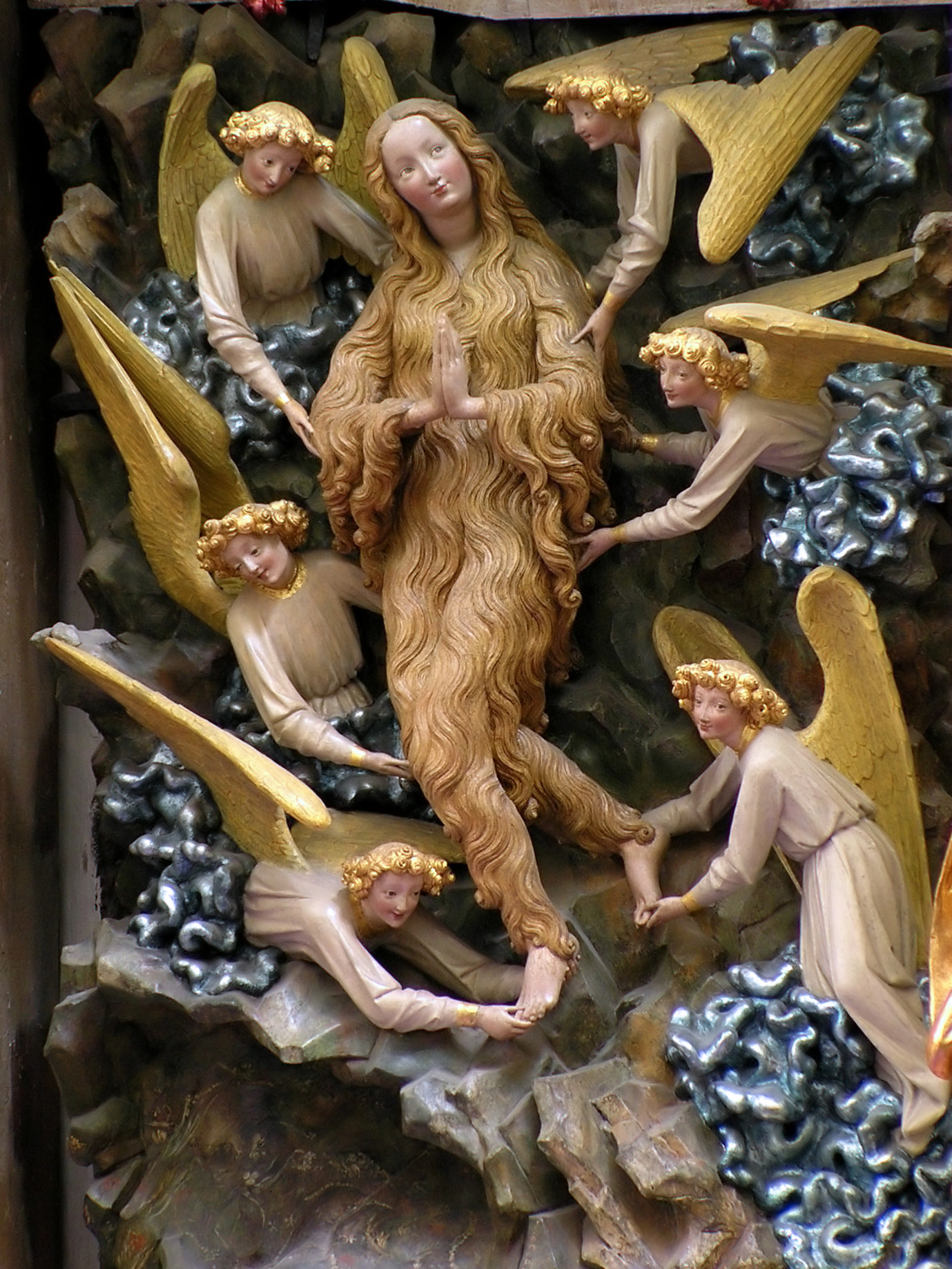
14th Century International Gothic Mary Magdalene in St. Johns' Cathedral in Toruń, Poland

Gothic art emerged in Île-de-France, France, in the early 12th century, at the Abbey Church of St Denis built by Abbot Suger. Thomas O'Hagan speculates on Lombard, Frankish and Norse influences feeding into Gothic. Wilhelm Worringer's Form in the Gothic (German: Formprobleme der Gotik, 1911) traces the psychological roots of the style back into the past at least as far as the Migration period.

== History ==
The style rapidly spread beyond its early manifestations in architecture to sculpture (both monumental and personal in size), to textile art, and to painting, which took a variety of forms, including fresco, stained glass, the illuminated manuscript, and panel painting. Monastic orders, especially the Cistercians and the Carthusians, commissioned many important ecclesiastical buildings, disseminating the style and developing distinctive variants of it across Europe. Regional variations of architecture remained important, even when, by the late-14th century, a coherent universal style — which Louis Courajod (1841–1896) dubbed "International Gothic" — had evolved, which continued until the late-15th century (and beyond in many areas).

Although artists of the Gothic period produced far more secular works than are often known today, generally the survival rate of religious art has been better than for secular equivalents, and a large proportion of the art from the period was religious, whether commissioned by the church or by the laity. Gothic art was often typological in nature, reflecting a belief that the events of the Old Testament pre-figured those of the New, and that this was indeed their main significance. Old and New Testament scenes appeared side-by-side in works like the Speculum Humanae Salvationis of the early-14th century, and in the decoration of churches. The Gothic period coincided with a great resurgence in Marian devotion, in which the visual arts played a major part. Images of the Virgin Mary developed from the Byzantine hieratic types, through the Coronation of the Virgin, to more human and intimate types, and cycles of the Life of the Virgin were very popular. Artists like Giotto (c. 1267 – 1337), Fra Angelico (c. 1395 – 1455) and Pietro Lorenzetti (c. 1280 – 1348) in Italy, and Early Netherlandish painting, all brought realism and more natural humanity to art. Western European artists, and their patrons, became much more confident in innovative iconography, and much more originality developed, although most artists still followed copied formulae.

Iconography was affected by changes in theology, with depictions of the Assumption of Mary gaining ground on the older Death of the Virgin theme, and in devotional practices such as the Devotio Moderna, which produced new treatments of Christ in subjects such as the Man of Sorrows, Pensive Christ and Pietà, which emphasised his human suffering and vulnerability, in a parallel movement to that in depictions of the Virgin. Even in Last Judgements Christ was now usually shown exposing his chest to show the wounds of his Passion. Saints appeared more frequently, and altarpieces showed saints relevant to the particular church or donor in attendance on a Crucifixion or on an enthroned Virgin and Child, or occupying the central space themselves (this usually for works designed for side-chapels). During the Gothic period many ancient iconographical features that originated in New Testament apocrypha — like the midwives at the Nativity — were gradually eliminated under clerical pressure, though others had become too well-established, and were considered harmless.

== Etymology ==
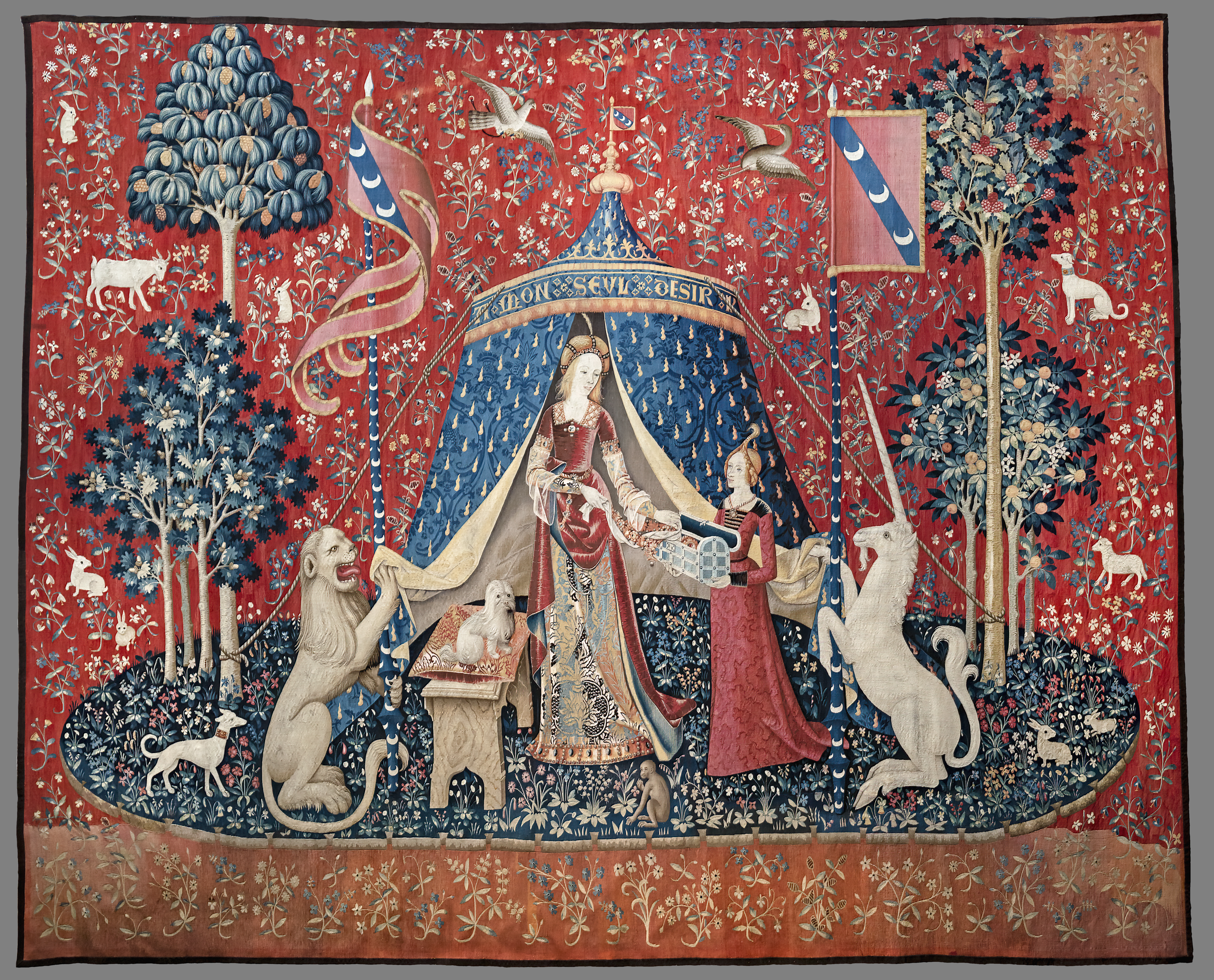
The Lady and the Unicorn, the title given to a series of six tapestries woven in Flanders, this one being called À Mon Seul Désir; late 15th century; wool and silk; 377 x 473 cm; Musée de Cluny, Paris

The word "Gothic" for art was initially used as a synonym for "Barbaric", and was therefore used pejoratively. Its critics saw this type of Medieval art as unrefined and too remote from the aesthetic proportions and shapes of Classical art. Renaissance authors believed that the Sack of Rome by the Gothic tribes in 410 had triggered the demise of the Classical world and all the values they held dear. In the 15th century, various Italian architects and writers complained that the new "barbarian" styles filtering down from north of the Alps posed a similar threat to the classical revival promoted by the early Renaissance.

The "Gothic" qualifier for this art movement was first used in Raphael's letter to Pope Leo X c. 1518 and was subsequently popularised by the Italian artist and writer Giorgio Vasari, who used it as early as 1530, calling Gothic art a "monstrous and barbarous" "disorder". Raphael claimed that the pointed arches of northern architecture were an echo of the primitive huts the Germanic forest dwellers formed by bending trees together – a myth which would resurface much later in a more positive sense in the writings of the German Romantic movement. "Gothic art" was strongly criticised by French authors such as Boileau, La Bruyère, Rousseau, before becoming a recognised form of art, and the wording becoming fixed. Molière would famously comment on Gothic:

The besotted taste of Gothic monuments,
These odious monsters of ignorant centuries,
Which the torrents of barbary spewed forth.

In its beginning, Gothic art was initially called "French work" (Opus Francigenum), thus attesting to the priority of France in the creation of this style.

== Painting ==
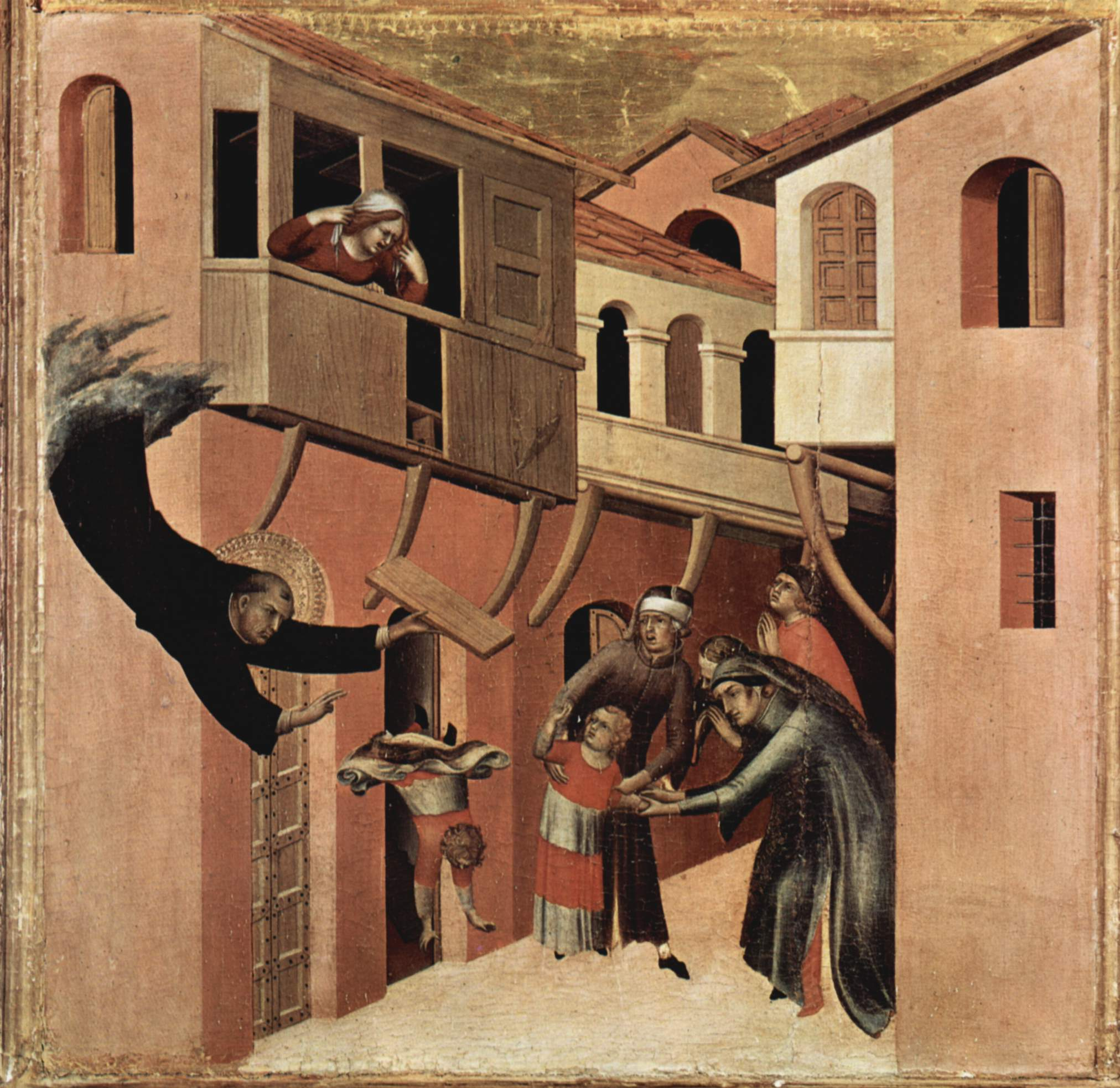
Simone Martini (1285–1344)

Painting in the Gothic style did not exist until around 1200, over 50 years after the beginnings of Gothic architecture and sculpture. The transition from Romanesque to Gothic is very imprecise and not at all a clear break, and Gothic ornamental detailing is often introduced before much change is seen in the style of figures or compositions themselves. Then figures become more animated in pose and facial expression, tend to be smaller in relation to the background of scenes, and are arranged more freely in the pictorial space, where there is room. This transition occurs first in England and France around 1200, in Germany around 1220 and Italy around 1300. Painting during the Gothic period was practiced in four primary media: frescos, panel paintings, manuscript illumination and stained glass.

=== Frescos ===
Frescos continued to be used as the main pictorial narrative craft on church walls in southern Europe as a continuation of early Christian and Romanesque traditions. An accident of survival has given Denmark and Sweden the largest groups of surviving church wall paintings in the Biblia pauperum style, usually extending up to recently constructed cross vaults. In both Denmark and Sweden, they were almost all covered with limewash after the Reformation which has preserved them, but some have also remained untouched since their creation. Among the finest examples from Denmark are those of the Elmelunde Master from the Danish island of Møn who decorated the churches of Fanefjord, Keldby and Elmelunde. Albertus Pictor is arguably the most well-known fresco artist from the period working in Sweden. Examples of Swedish churches with well-preserved frescos include Tensta, Gökhem and Anga churches.

=== Stained glass ===
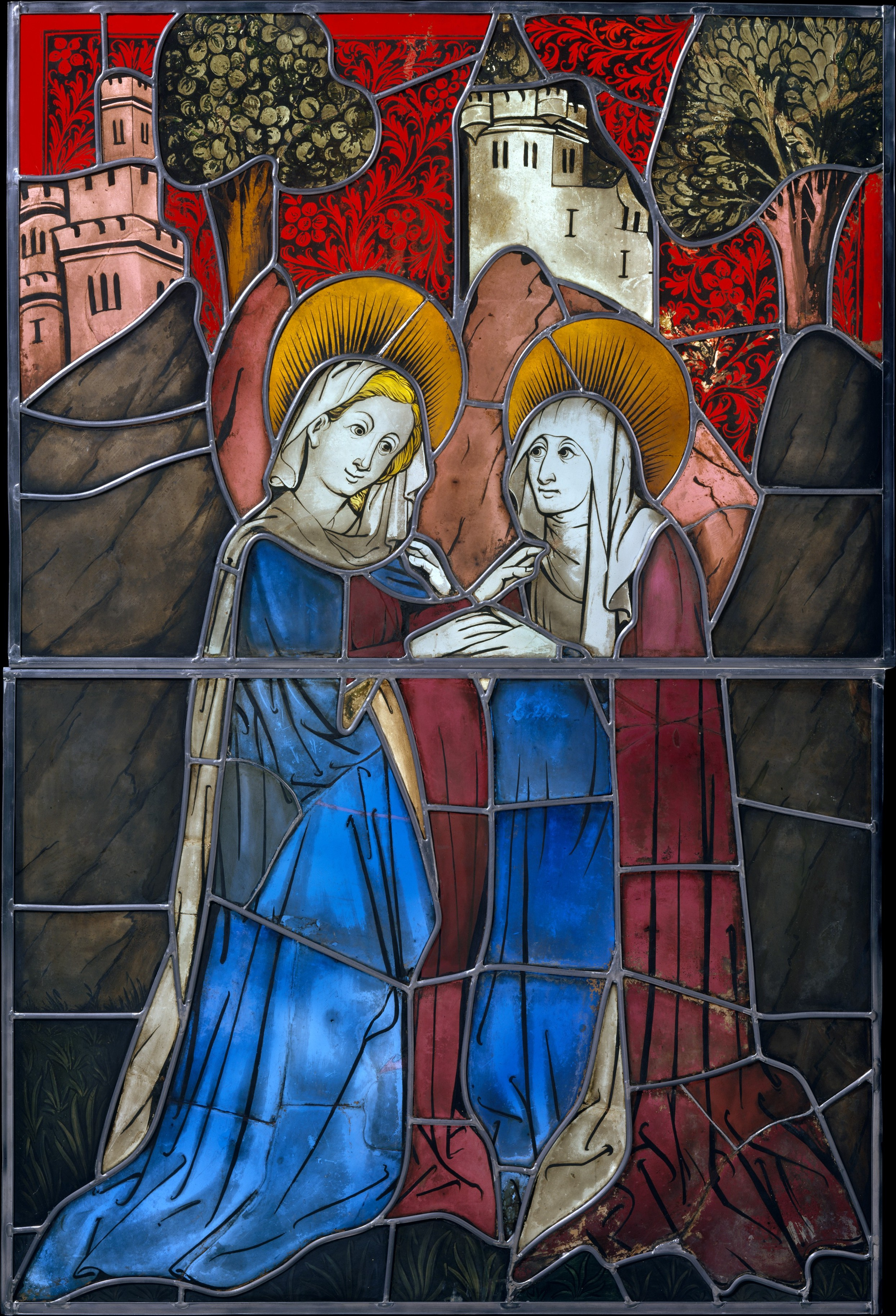
Part of German stained glass panel of 1444 with the Visitation; pot metal of various colours, including white glass, black vitreous paint, yellow silver stain, and the "olive-green" parts are enamel. The plant patterns in the red sky are formed by scratching away black paint from the red glass before firing. A restored panel with new lead cames

In northern Europe, stained glass was an important and prestigious form of painting until the 15th century, when it became supplanted by panel painting. Gothic architecture greatly increased the amount of glass in large buildings, partly to allow for wide expanses of glass, as in rose windows. In the early part of the period mainly black paint and clear or brightly coloured glass was used, but in the early 14th century the use of compounds of silver, painted on glass which was then fired, allowed a number of variations of colour, centred on yellows, to be used with clear glass in a single piece. By the end of the period designs increasingly used large pieces of glass which were painted, with yellows as the dominant colours, and relatively few smaller pieces of glass in other colours.

=== Manuscripts and printmaking ===
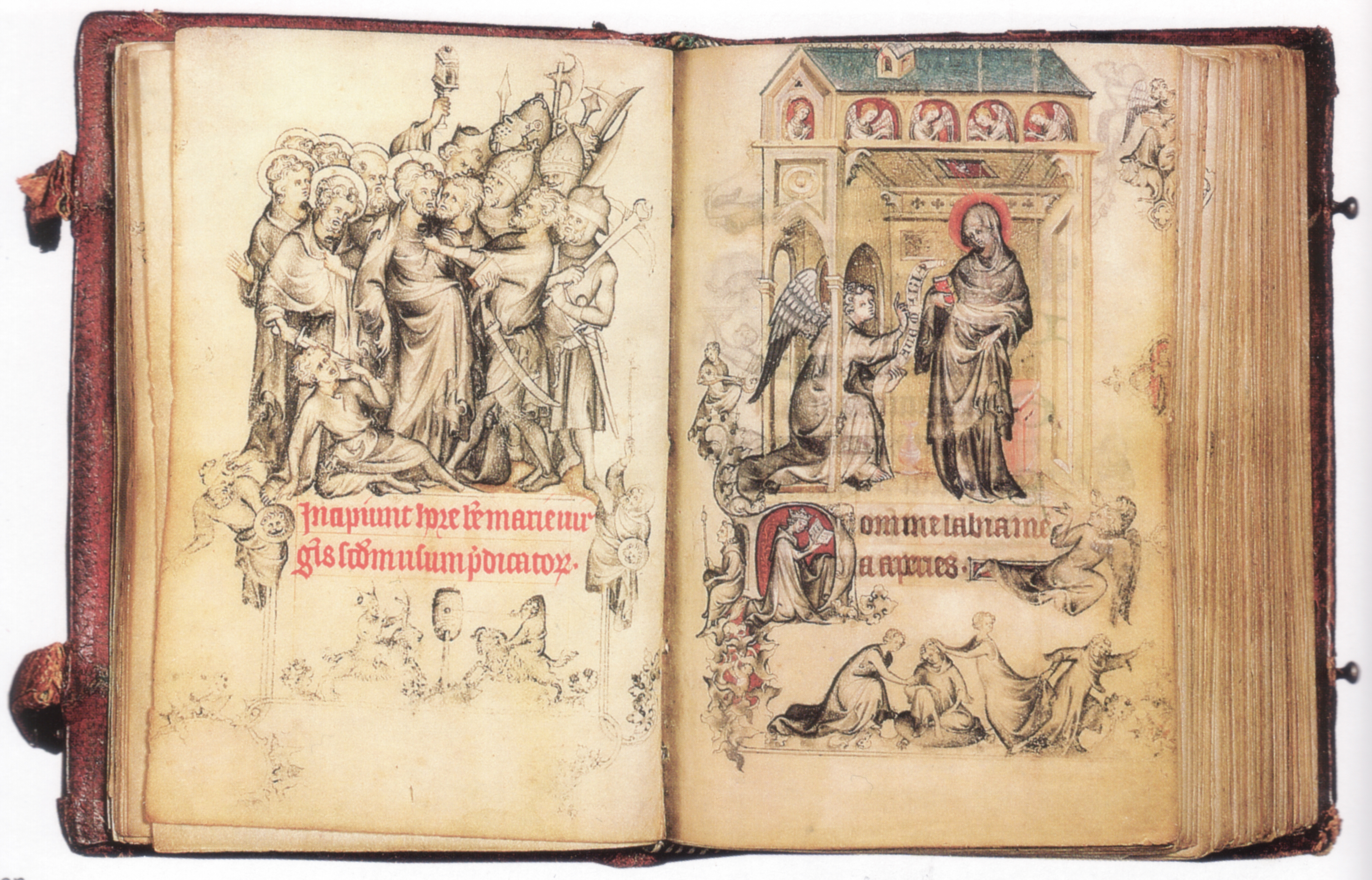
Hours of Jeanne d'Evreux, by Jean Pucelle, Paris, 1320s

Illuminated manuscripts represent the most complete record of Gothic painting, providing a record of styles in places where no monumental works have otherwise survived. The earliest full manuscripts with French Gothic illustrations date to the middle of the 13th century. Many such illuminated manuscripts were royal bibles, although psalters also included illustrations; the Parisian Psalter of Saint Louis, dating from 1253 to 1270, features 78 full-page illuminations in tempera paint and gold leaf.

During the late 13th century, scribes began to create prayer books for the laity, often known as books of hours due to their use at prescribed times of the day. Among the earliest is an example by William de Brailes that seems to have been written for an unknown laywoman living in a small village near Oxford in about 1240. Nobility frequently purchased such texts, paying handsomely for decorative illustrations; among the most well-known creators of these is Jean Pucelle, whose Hours of Jeanne d'Evreux was commissioned by King Charles IV as a gift for his queen, Jeanne d'Évreux. Elements of the French Gothic present in such works include the use of decorative page framing reminiscent of the architecture of the time with elongated and detailed figures. The use of spatial indicators such as building elements and natural features such as trees and clouds also denote the French Gothic style of illumination.

From the middle of the 14th century, blockbooks with both text and images cut as woodcut seem to have been affordable by parish priests in the Low Countries, where they were most popular. By the end of the century, printed books with illustrations, still mostly on religious subjects, were rapidly becoming accessible to the prosperous middle class, as were engravings of fairly high quality by printmakers like Israhel van Meckenem and Master E. S. In the 15th century, the introduction of cheap prints, mostly in woodcut, made it possible even for peasants to have devotional images at home. These images, tiny at the bottom of the market, often crudely coloured, were sold in thousands but are now extremely rare, most having been pasted to walls.

=== Altarpiece and panel painting ===
Painting with oil on canvas did not become popular until the 15th and 16th centuries and was a hallmark of Renaissance art. In Northern Europe the important and innovative school of Early Netherlandish painting is in an essentially Gothic style, but can also be regarded as part of the Northern Renaissance, as there was a long delay before the Italian revival of interest in classicism had a great impact in the north. Painters like Robert Campin and Jan van Eyck made use of the technique of oil painting to create minutely detailed works, correct in perspective, where apparent realism was combined with richly complex symbolism arising precisely from the realistic detail they could now include, even in small works. In Early Netherlandish painting, from the richest cities of Northern Europe, a new minute realism in oil painting was combined with subtle and complex theological allusions, expressed precisely through the highly detailed settings of religious scenes. The Mérode Altarpiece (1420s) of Robert Campin and the Washington Van Eyck Annunciation or Madonna of Chancellor Rolin (both 1430s, by Jan van Eyck) are examples. For the wealthy, small panel paintings, even polyptychs in oil painting were becoming increasingly popular, often showing donor portraits alongside, though often much smaller than the Virgin or saints depicted. These were usually displayed in the home.

== Sculpture ==
=== Monumental sculpture ===
The Gothic period is essentially defined by Gothic architecture, and does not entirely fit with the development of style in sculpture in either its start or finish. The facades of large churches, especially around doors, continued to have large tympanums, but also rows of sculpted figures spreading around them.

The statues on the Western (Royal) Portal at Chartres Cathedral (c. 1145) show an elegant but exaggerated columnar elongation, but those on the south transept portal, from 1215 to 1220, show a more naturalistic style and increasing detachment from the wall behind, and some awareness of the classical tradition. These trends were continued in the west portal at Reims Cathedral of a few years later, where the figures are almost in the round, as became usual as Gothic spread across Europe. Bamberg Cathedral has perhaps the largest assemblage of 13th century sculpture, culminating in 1240 with the Bamberg Rider, the first life-size equestrian statue in Western art since the 6th century.

"In Italy the Gospel of Gothic was preached from pulpits not from tympana, and the unit of the sculptor's thinking was an autonomous, self-consistent work of art" (John Pope-Hennessy). Nicola Pisano (1258–78) and his son Giovanni developed a style that is often called Proto-Renaissance, with unmistakable influence from Roman sarcophagi and sophisticated and crowded compositions, including a sympathetic handling of nudity, in marble relief panels on Nicola's Pulpit in the Pisa Baptistery (signed 1260), both their pulpit of Siena Cathedral (1265–68), the Fontana Maggiore in Perugia, and Giovanni's pulpit in Pistoia of 1301.

Another revival of classical style is seen in the International Gothic work of Claus Sluter and his followers in Burgundy and Flanders around 1400. Late Gothic sculpture continued in the North, with a fashion for very large, wooden, sculpted altarpieces with increasingly virtuoso carving and large numbers agitated expressive figures. Later works in limewood, specific to the Upper Rhine and Bavaria in southern Germany, executed by the huge workshop of Tilman Riemenschneider or by Veit Stoss were oftentimes without any polychromy. The style was continued well into the 16th century, gradually absorbing Italian Renaissance influences, with most surviving examples still in their original location, after much iconoclasm elsewhere.

Life-size tomb effigies in stone or alabaster became popular for the wealthy, and grand multi-level tombs evolved, with the Scaliger Tombs of Verona so large they had to be moved outside the church. By the 15th century there was an industry exporting Nottingham alabaster altar reliefs in groups of panels over much of Europe for economical parishes who could not afford stone retables.

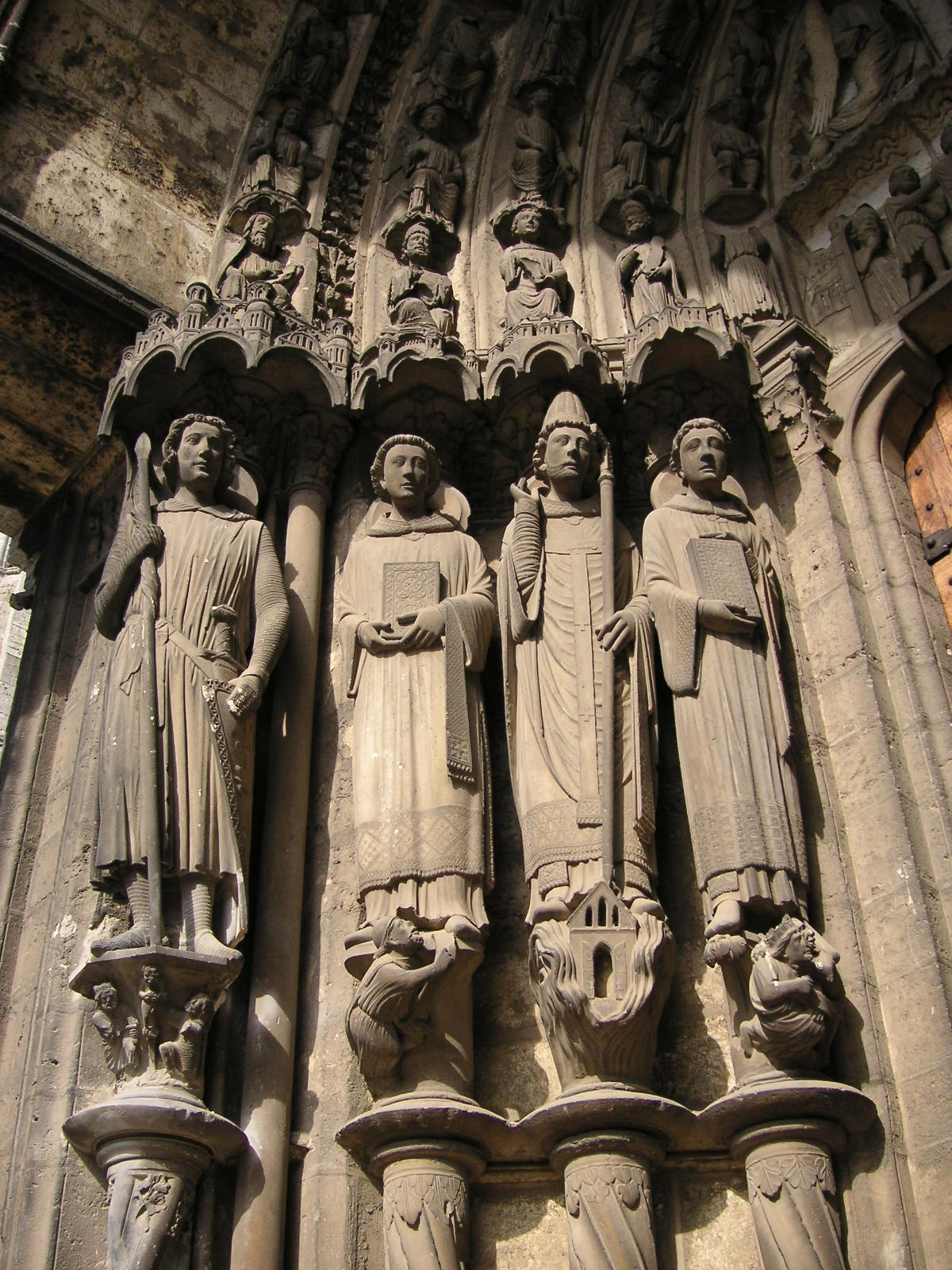
South portal of Chartres Cathedral (c. 1215–20).

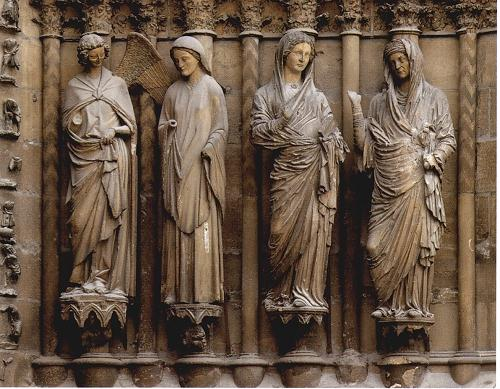
West portal at Reims Cathedral, Annunciation group.

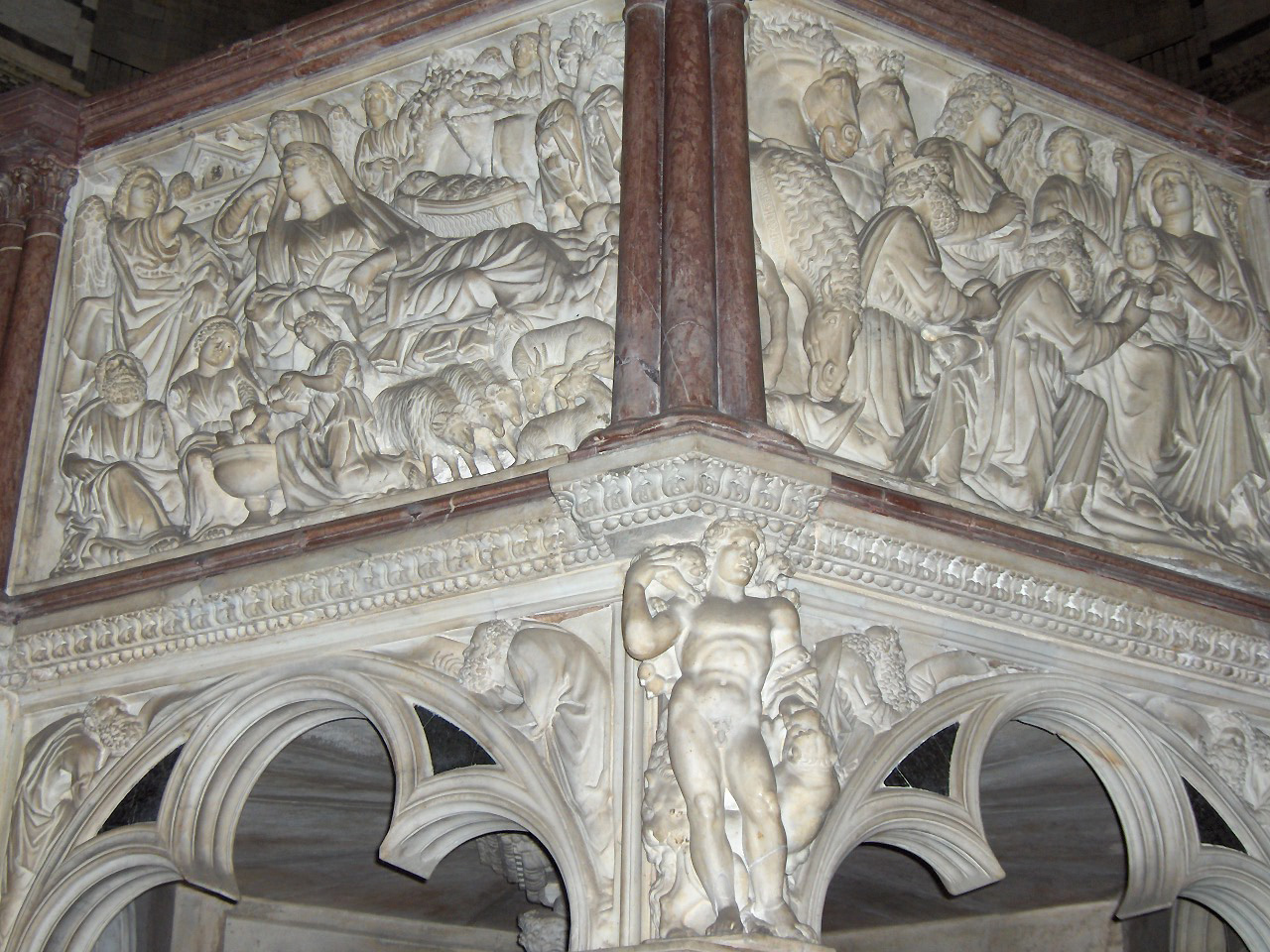
Nicola Pisano, Nativity and Adoration of the Magi from the pulpit in the Pisa Baptistery, 1260.

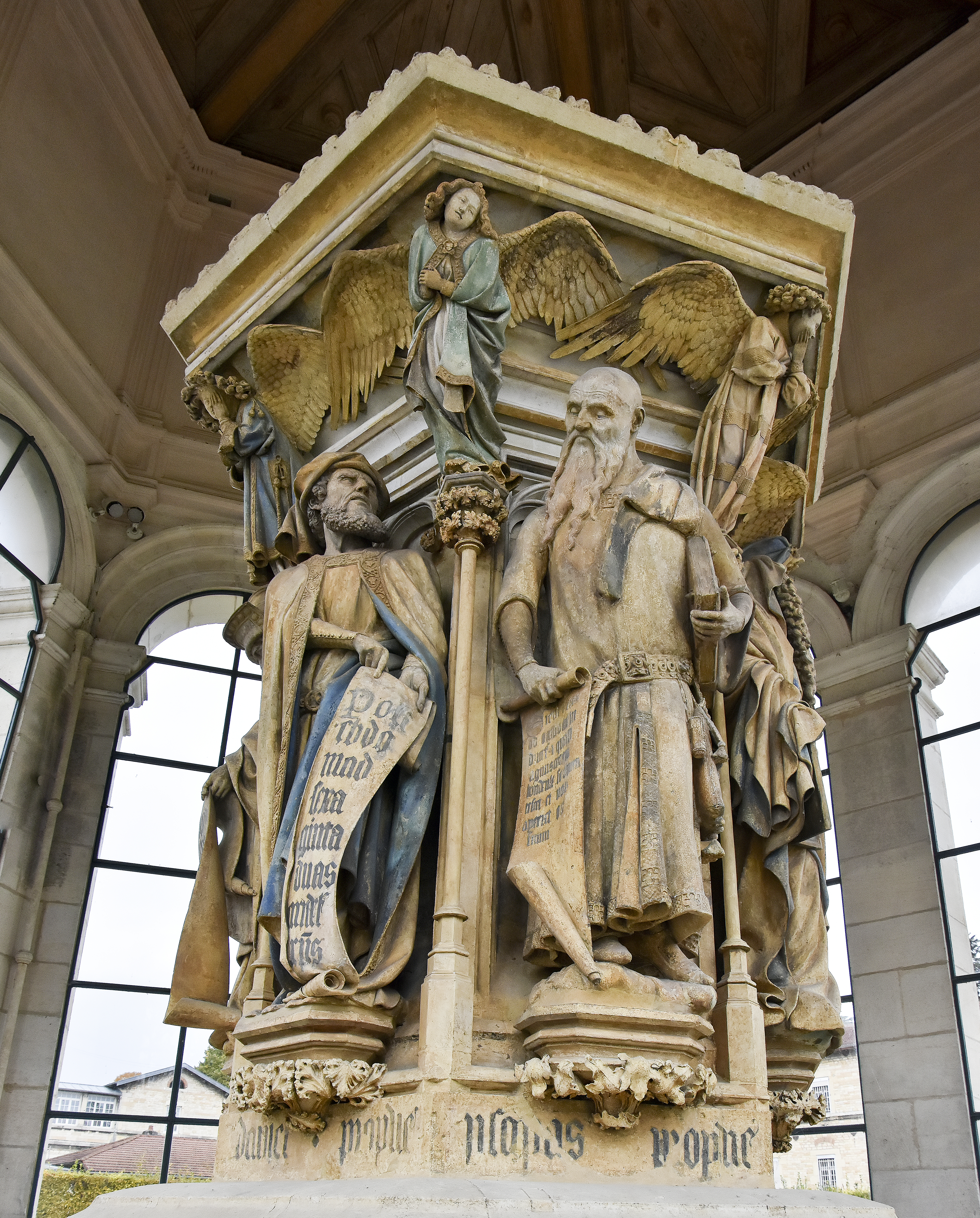
Claus Sluter, Daniel and Jesaiah from the Well of Moses, 1350–1406.

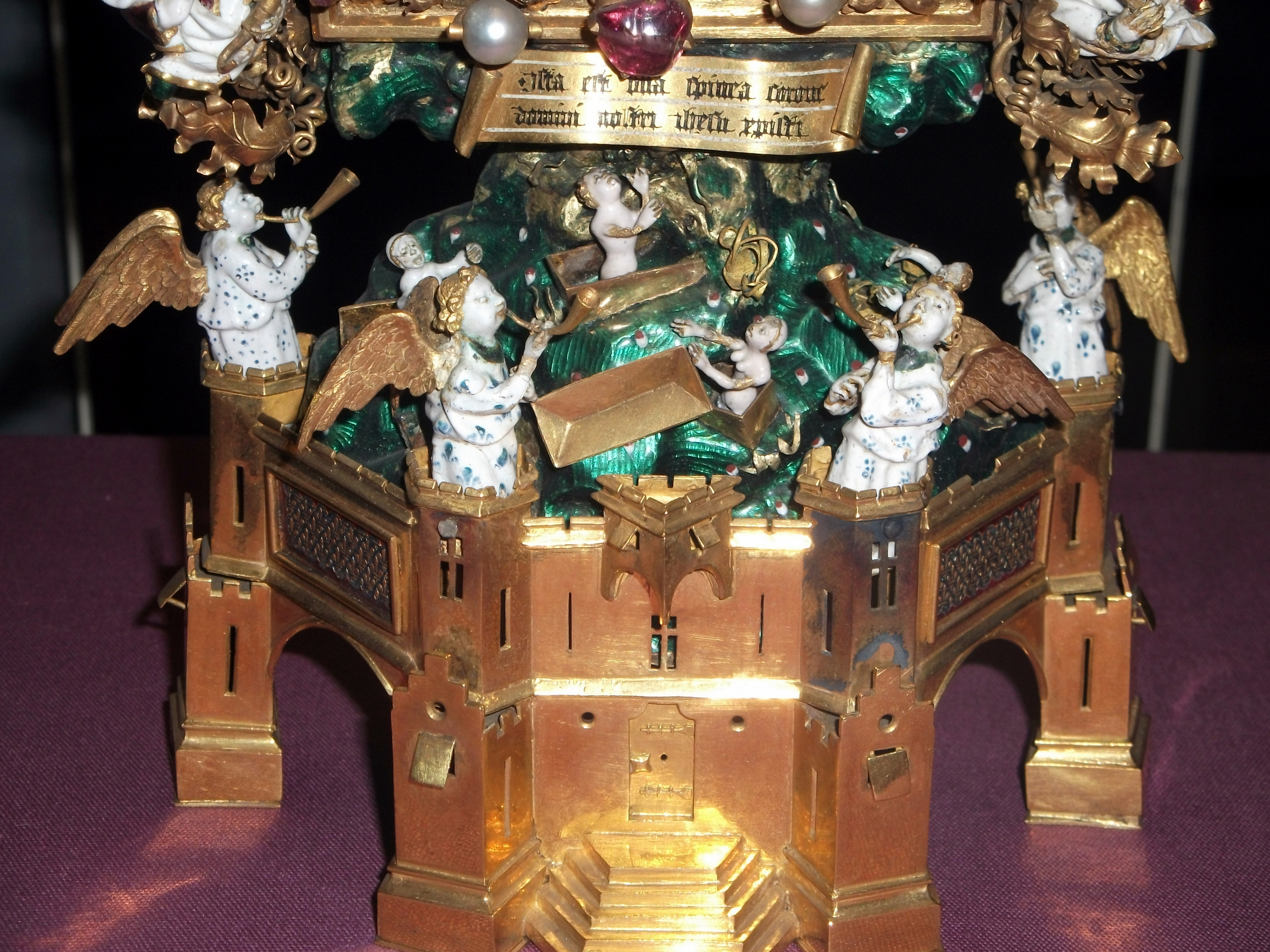
Base of the Holy Thorn Reliquary, French (Paris), 1390s, a Resurrection of the Dead in gold, enamel and gems.

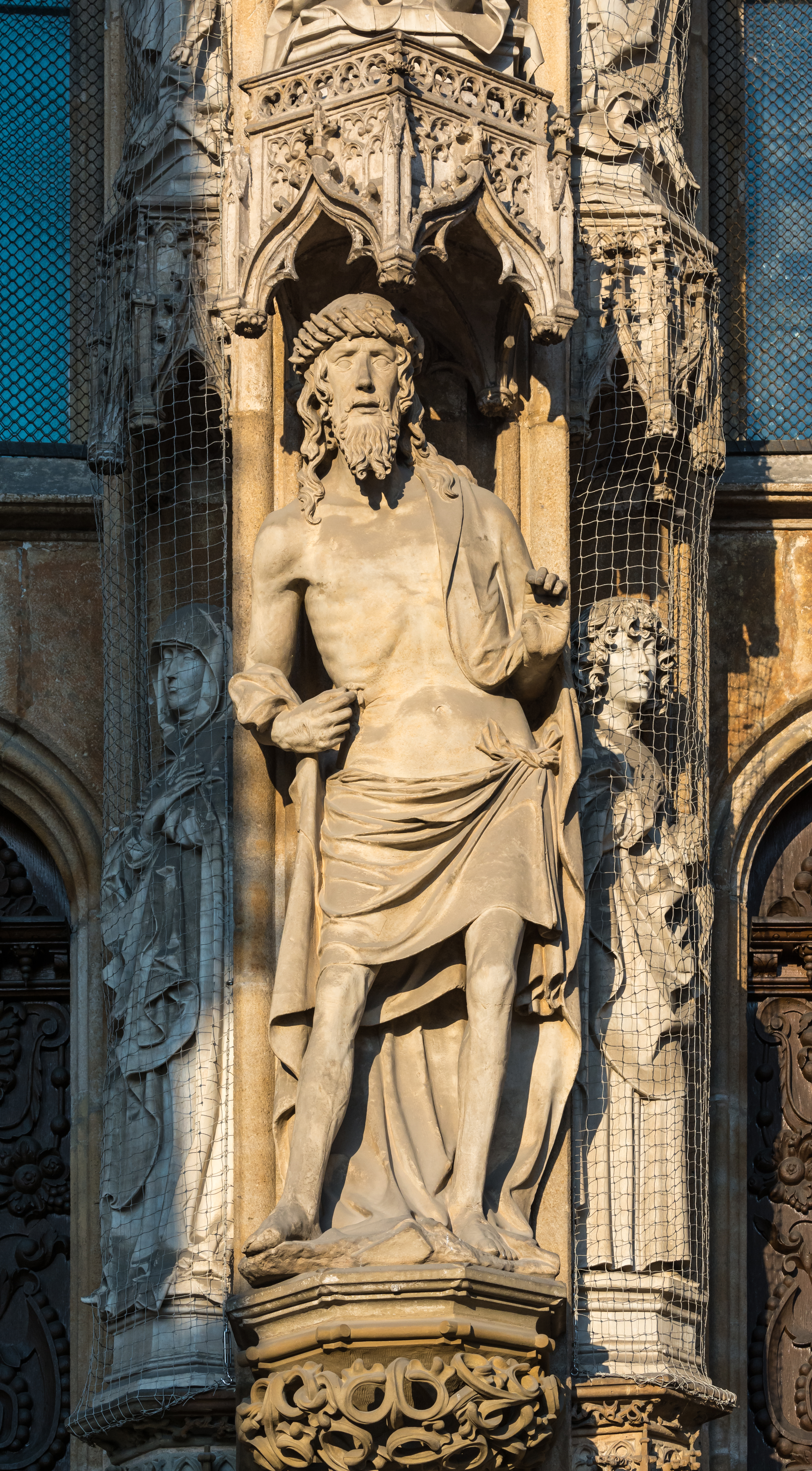
Man of Sorrows (copy) on the main portal of Ulm Münster by Hans Multscher, 1429.

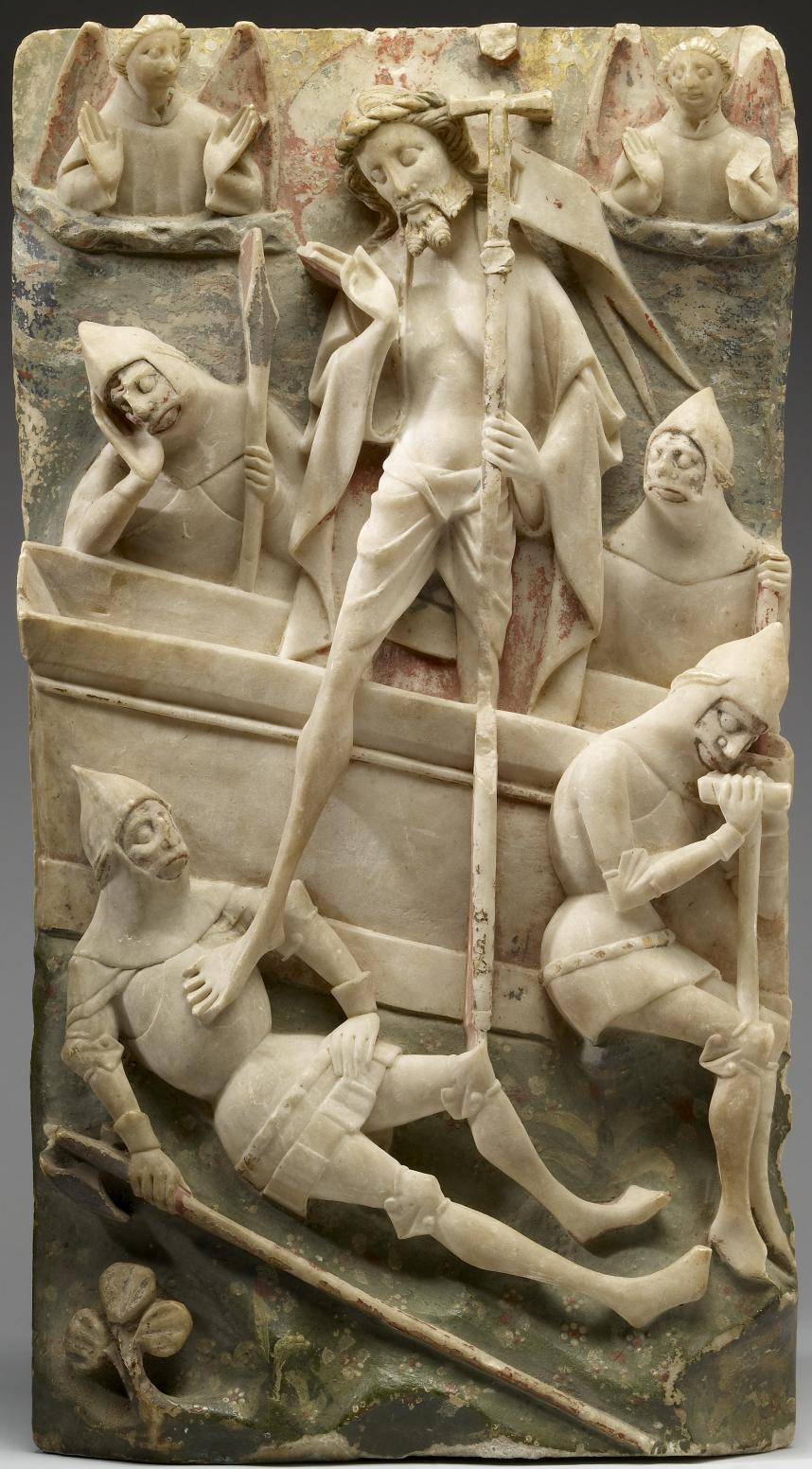
Panelled altarpiece section with Resurrection of Christ, English Nottingham alabaster, 1450–90, with remains of paint.

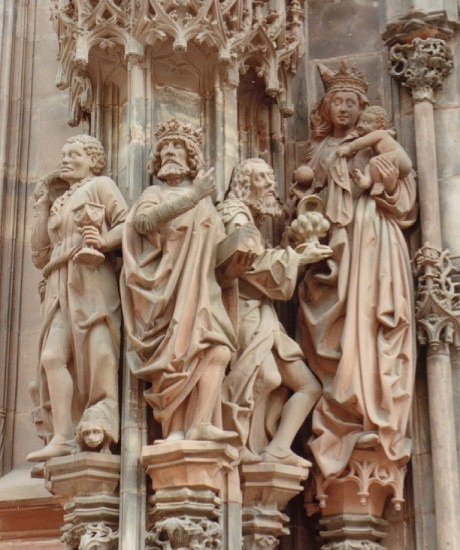
Later Gothic depiction of the Adoration of the Magi from Strasbourg Cathedral.

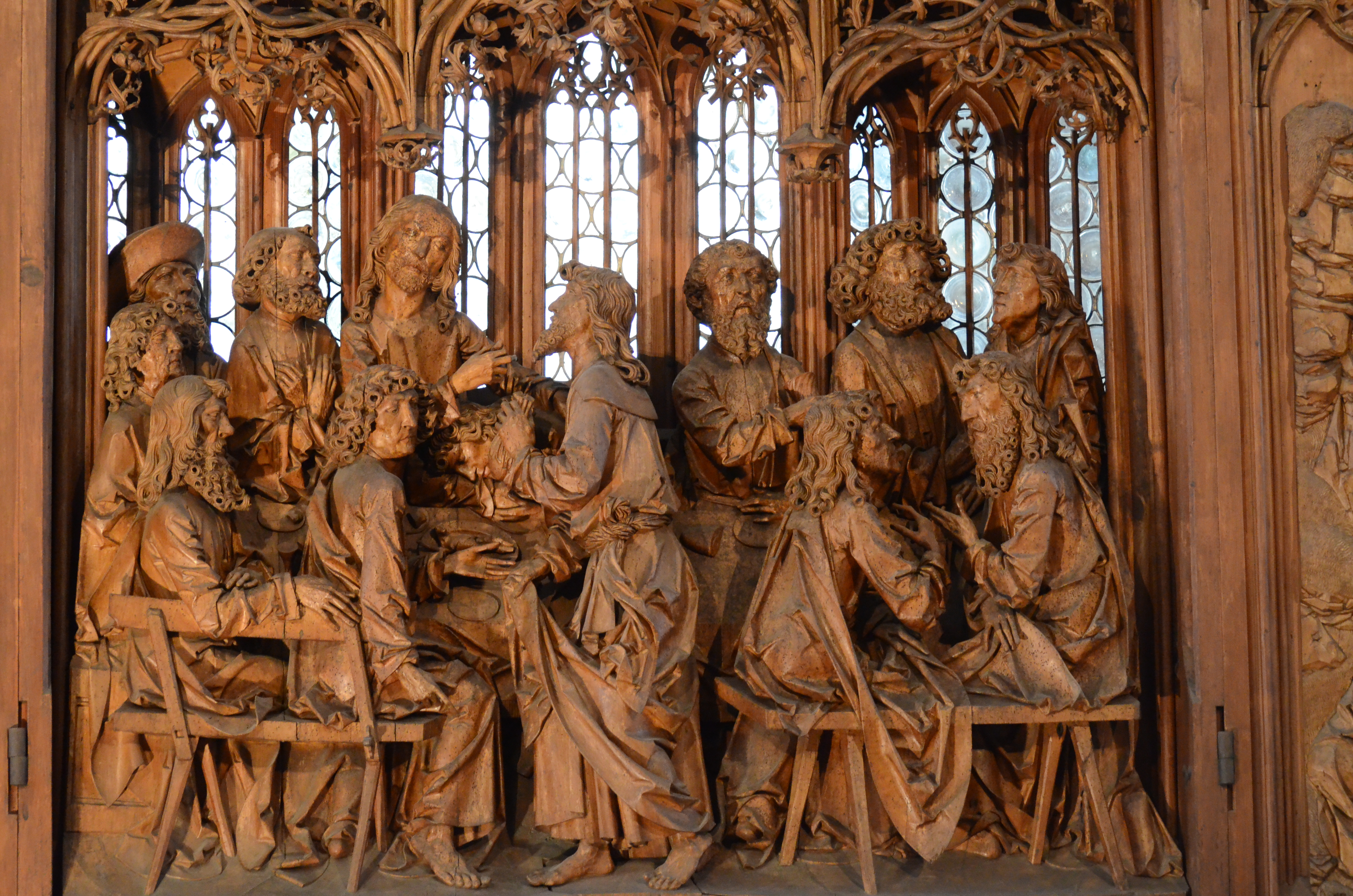
Detail of the Last Supper from Tilman Riemenschneider's Altar of the Holy Blood, 1501–05, carved limewood, Rothenburg ob der Tauber, Bavaria.

=== Portable sculpture ===
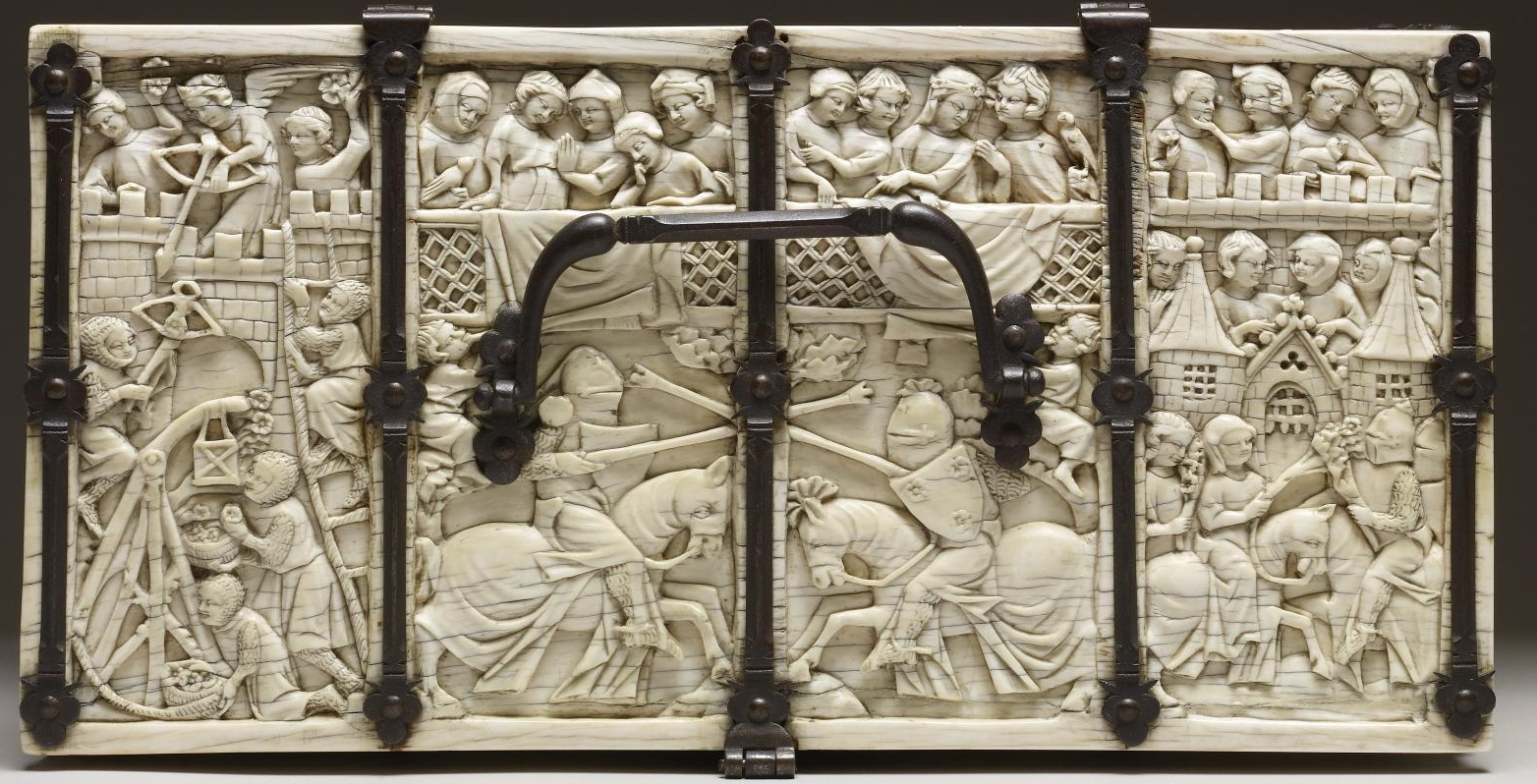
Lid of the Walters Casket, with the Siege of the Castle of Love at left, and jousting. Paris, 1330–1350

Small carvings, for a mainly lay and often female market, became a considerable industry in Paris and some other centres. Types of ivories included small, devotional polyptychs, single figures, especially of the Virgin, mirror-cases, combs, and elaborate caskets with scenes from Romances, used as engagement presents. The very wealthy collected extravagantly elaborate, jewelled and enamelled metalwork, both secular and religious, like the Duc de Berry's Holy Thorn Reliquary, until they ran short of money, when they were melted down again for cash.

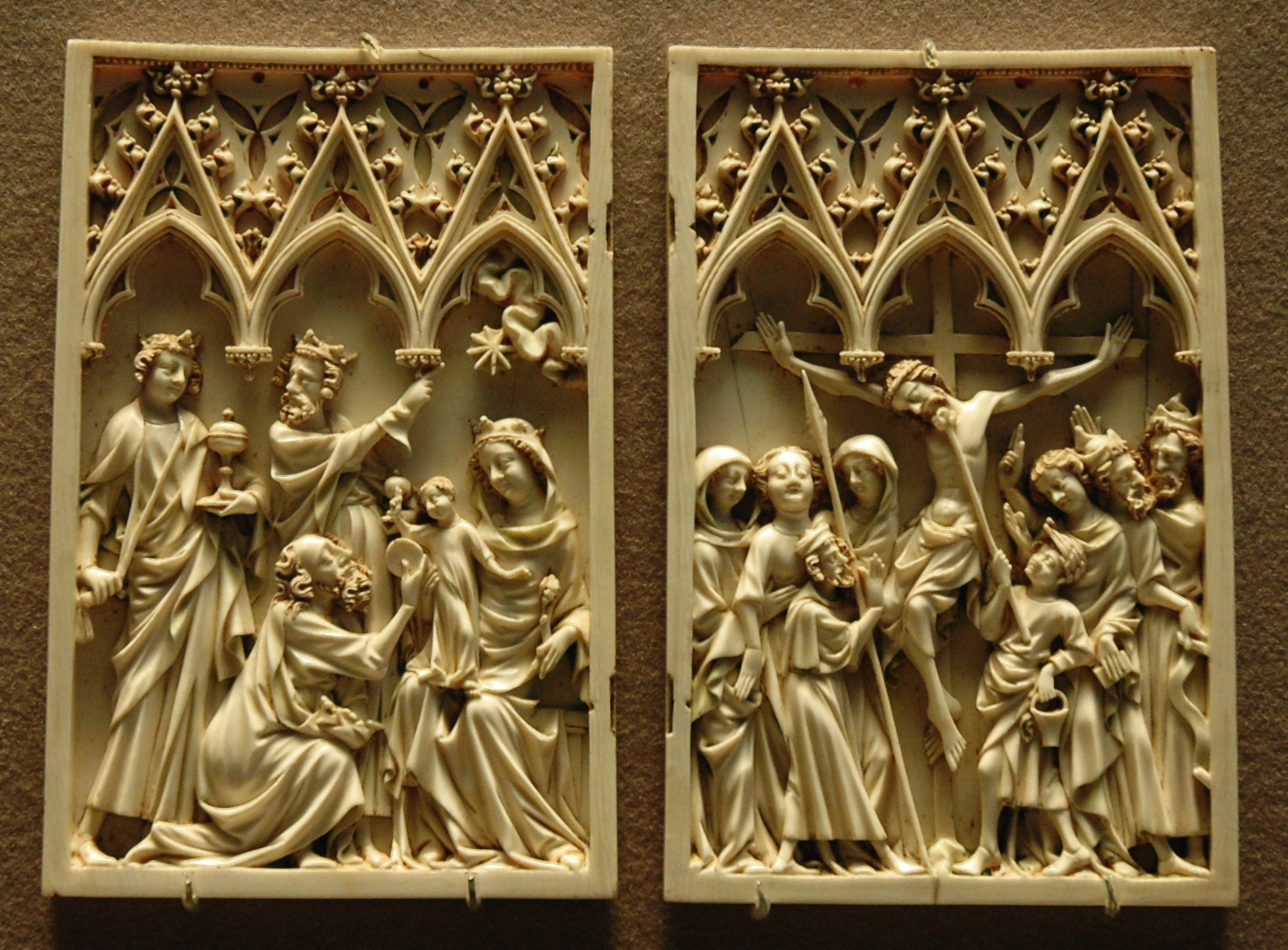
Ivory diptych, with some of the coloured paint remaining. Adoration of the Magi and Crucifixion. Meuse valley, France, c. 1350

Gothic sculptures independent of architectural ornament were primarily created as devotional objects for the home or intended as donations for local churches, although small reliefs in ivory, bone and wood cover both religious and secular subjects, and were for church and domestic use. These sculptures were created by urban artisans, and the most common theme for three-dimensional small statues is the Virgin Mary alone or with a child. Paris was the main centre of ivory workshops, and exported to most of northern Europe, though Italy also had a considerable production. An exemplar of these independent sculptures is among the collections of the Abbey Church of St Denis; the silver-gilt Virgin and Child dates to 1339 and features Mary enveloped in a flowing cloak holding an infantile Christ figure. Both the simplicity of the cloak and the youth of the child presage other sculptures found in northern Europe dating to the 14th century and early 15th century. Such sculpture shows an evolution from an earlier stiff and elongated style, still partly Romanesque, into a spatial and naturalistic feel in the late 12th and early 13th century. Other French Gothic sculptural subjects included figures and scenes from popular literature of the time. Imagery from the poetry of the troubadours was particularly popular among artisans of mirror-cases and small boxes presumably for use by women. The Casket with Scenes of Romances (Walters 71264) of 1330–50 is an unusually large example with space for a number of scenes from different literary sources.

Souvenirs of pilgrimages to shrines, such as clay or lead badges, medals and ampullae stamped with images were also popular and cheap. Their secular equivalent, the livery badge, showed signs of feudal and political loyalty or alliance that came to be regarded as a social menace in England under bastard feudalism. The cheaper forms were sometimes given away free, as with the 13,000 badges ordered in 1483 by King Richard III of England in fustian cloth with his emblem of a white boar for the investiture of his son Edward as Prince of Wales, a huge number given the population at the time. The Dunstable Swan Jewel, modelled fully in the round in enamelled gold, is a far more exclusive version, that would have been given to someone very close or important to the donor.

== See also ==
- Blackletter (also known as Gothic script)
- Church frescos in Denmark
- Church frescos in Sweden
- Danse Macabre
- Gothic architecture
- Gothic cathedrals and churches
- History of painting
- List of Gothic artists
- Pleurants
- Renaissance of the 12th century
- The Ten Virgins
- Timeline of Italian artists to 1800
- Western painting
