= Jean Pucelle =

Manuscript illuminator

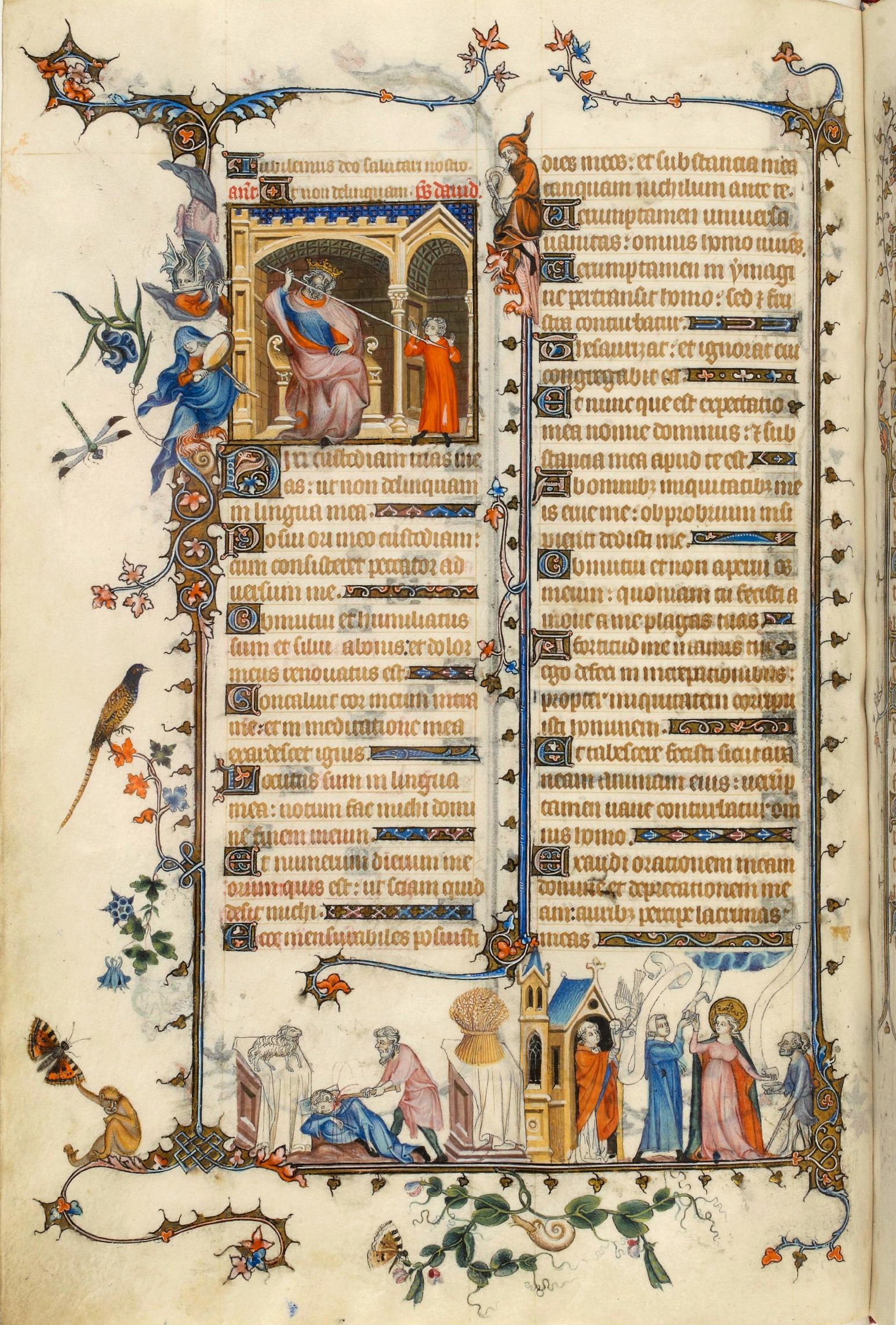
Page from the Belleville Breviary by Jean Pucelle

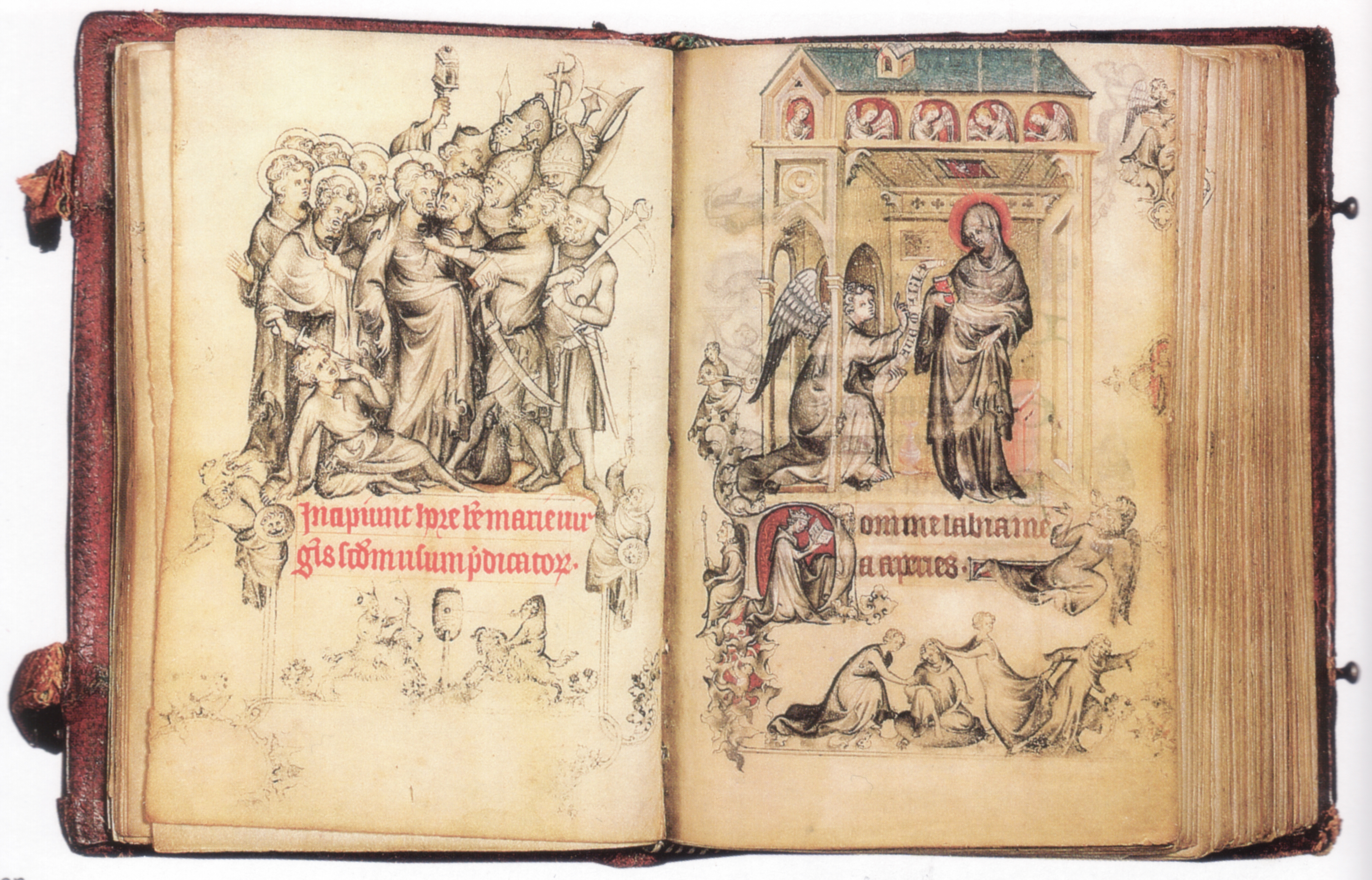
The Hours of Jeanne d'Evreux by Jean Pucelle

Jean Pucelle (c. 1300 – 1355; active c. 1320–1350) was a Parisian Gothic-era manuscript illuminator who excelled in the invention of drolleries as well as traditional iconography. He is considered one of the best miniaturists of the early 14th century. He worked primarily under the patronage of the royal court and is believed to have been responsible for the introduction of the arte nuova of Giotto and Duccio to Northern Gothic art. His work shows a distinct influence of the Italian Trecento art Duccio is credited with creating. His style is characterized by delicate figures rendered in grisaille, accented with touches of color.

Pucelle was a major contributor towards the development of manuscript illumination. By the 1380s, French art of illumination can be divided into two, one of which included artists following on the stylistic traditions of Pucelle, the other being Flemish realism.

== Notable works ==
- The Hours of Jeanne d'Evreux, a private prayer book done as a royal commission for the queen of France, Jeanne d'Évreux (c. 1324–28), which reflects the Maestà (c. 1325) by Duccio.
- Belleville Breviary believed to have been owned by Jeanne de Clisson.
- He is also credited with the Franciscan breviary believed to have once been owned by Blanche of France.
- His earliest documented work is believed to be the design for the great seal of the Confraternity of the Hospital of St. Jacques-aux-Pelerins in Paris, indicating that Pucelle worked and designed in a variety of media ranging from enamels to stained glass.

Pucelle's proto-Renaissance style is evident in The Hours of Jeanne d'Evreux, the Belleville Breviary and the Bible of Robert de Billyng, which all displayed such features as sculpturally modeled figures, three-dimensional treatment of space and a new form of psychological expression.
