= Belleville Breviary =

Illuminated breviary

The Belleville Breviary (Paris, Bibliothèque Nationale, MS lat. 10484, 2 volumes) is an illuminated breviary. It was produced in Paris some time between 1323 and 1326 by the artist known as Jean Pucelle, probably for Jeanne de Belleville, the wife of Olivier IV de Clisson. The breviary is divided into two volumes of 446 and 430 folios. Volume 1 contains the prayers used during the summer, while volume 2 contains those used during the winter.

The manuscript was owned by Jeanne de Belleville. It was later owned by Charles V of France and his son Charles VI. Charles VI gave the manuscript to his son-in-law Richard II of England. Henry IV of England gave it to Jean, Duc de Berry. Jean gave it to his niece Marie, who was a nun at Poissy. It was purchased in 1454 by another nun at Poissy, Marie Jouvenal des Ursins.
