= Chester Beatty Library =

Archive in Dublin, Ireland

Chester Beatty
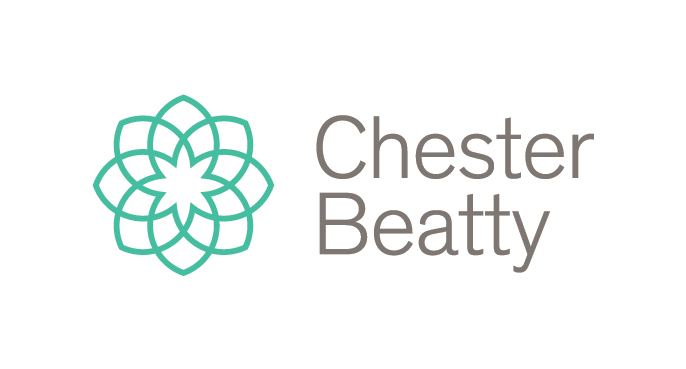

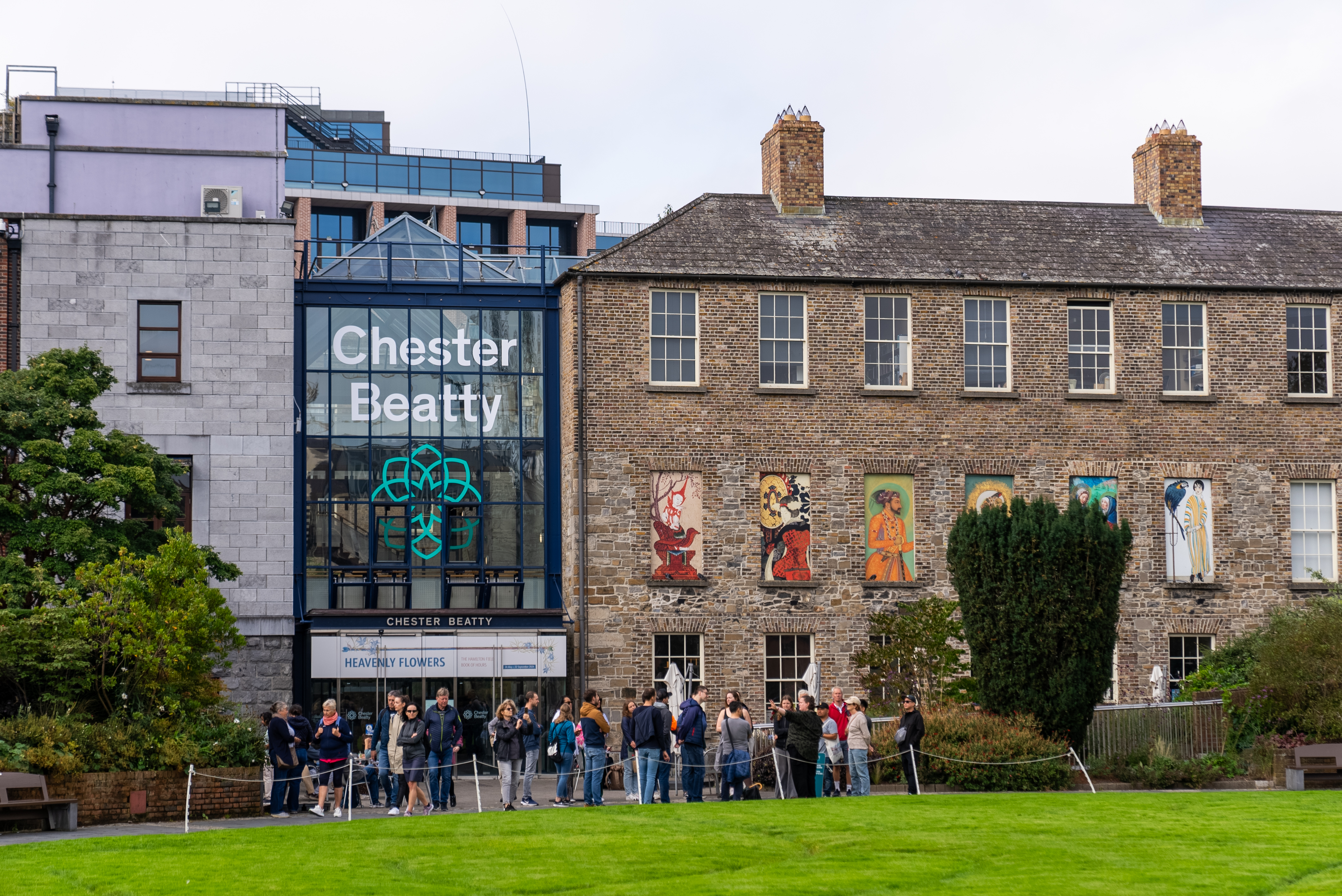
- Entrance of the Chester Beatty, Dublin, Ireland
- Interactive fullscreen map
- Former name: Chester Beatty Library
- Established: 1953
- Location: Dublin Castle, Dublin
- Coordinates: 53°20′31″N 6°16′01″W
- Type: Art Museum, library, Visitor Attraction
- Collections: The Chester Beatty is Ireland’s leading museum of world cultures, caring for and sharing an extraordinary collection of manuscripts, rare books, miniature paintings and other decorative objects that are of world importance. With collections from Europe, the Middle East and across Asia, the role of the museum is unique in Ireland’s cultural landscape.
- Collection size: approx 25,000
- Visitors: 530,000 (2024)
- Founder: Sir Alfred Chester Beatty
- Public transit access: Luas, Dublin Bus, DART
- Website: chesterbeatty.ie

The Chester Beatty Library (Irish: Leabharlann Chester Beatty), now known as the Chester Beatty, is a museum and library in the grounds of Dublin Castle, Ireland. It was established in 1953 to house the collections of mining magnate Sir Alfred Chester Beatty. It won the European Museum of the Year award in 2002.

The Chester Beatty is one of the premier sources for scholarship in both the Old and New Testaments and is home to one of the most significant collections of historical artefacts and manuscripts from all over the world. The museum also offers numerous temporary exhibitions, many of which include works of art on loan from foreign institutions and collections. The museum contains a number of priceless objects, including one of the surviving volumes of the first illustrated Life of the Prophet and the Gospel of Mani, one of the last surviving Manichaean scriptures. Many manuscripts from the Medinet Madi library are currently held at the Chester Beatty.

== History ==
The library/museum was established in 1953 at its original location of 20 Shrewsbury Road in Dublin 4. As of 1995, work was underway at the Clock Tower Building of Dublin Castle in preparation for the relocation there of the Chester Beatty Library. The relocation was "expected to cost approximately £5.5 million" which was planned to be sourced from a "mixture of National Plan funds for the cultural institutions and direct Exchequer funding."

A statement from the Department of Arts, Culture and the Gaeltacht at the time said that it was expected that the relocation of the library to the Dublin Castle site "would significantly increase its exposure to the public and in the process maximise the cultural, educational and tourism potential of this priceless collection of manuscripts, paintings and other works of art". The museum opened at its new location on 7 February 2000, the 125th anniversary of Beatty's birth.

=== Endowment ===
Writing in the journal Museum Ireland in 1995, academic and museum director Pat Cooke wrote of the paradox in the Beatty endowment:

There is an irony. Wealthy men, not otherwise renowned for their generosity, made such institutions the singular outlet of a profligate generosity. The Carnegie Libraries and our own Chester Beatty Library are remarkable examples of aberrant behaviour on the part of otherwise ruthless capitalists. Needless to say, they saw in these grand gestures a form of self reflecting glory.

== Galleries ==
The museum's collections are displayed in two galleries: "Sacred Traditions" and "Arts of the Book". Both displays exhibit manuscripts, miniature paintings, prints, drawings, rare books and some decorative arts from the Persian, Islamic, East Asian and Western Collections.

== Collections ==
=== Western Collections ===
The Western Collection houses many illuminated manuscripts, rare books and Old Master prints and drawings. With biblical texts written in Armenian, Church Slavonic, Coptic, Ge’ez, Greek, Latin and Syriac, the collection's Christian material comes from diverse cultural and geographical backgrounds. The papyrus codices in the Chester Beatty include Papyrus 45 and Papyrus 46 among others which are some of the earliest surviving Christian artefacts in the world. In addition, a significant proportion of the rare printed books and prints are also Christian in focus. The collection of papyri is one of the most extensive in the world and includes almost the entire corpus of Ancient Egyptian Love Songs.

=== Islamic Collections ===
The Islamic Collection is divided between the Arabic, Persian, Turkish, Qur'an and Mughal-Era Indian Collections. The Arabic texts include treatises on religion, history, jurisprudence, medicine, geography, mathematics, astronomy and linguistics. Some of the finest miniatures from imperial Mughal albums, called Muraqqa', are housed in the Chester Beatty Library, with important paintings from the Late Shah Jahan Album and the Minto Album. The albums were the subject of an exhibition and publication by the Islamic curator, Dr Elaine Wright, Muraqqa': Imperial Albums of the Chester Beatty Library. Often on display is the Ibn al-Bawwab Qur'an, copied by one of the greatest medieval Islamic calligraphers.

=== Persian Collection ===
The Persian collection contains various miniatures and manuscripts of classical Persian poets such as Ferdowsi and Nizami.

=== East Asian Collections ===
The East Asian Collection has one of the most extensive collections of carved snuff bottles, many of which were included in the catalogue, The Chester Beatty Library, Dublin: Chinese Snuff Bottles. It also has Japanese art, including a pair of long picture-scrolls painted in the 17th century by Kanō Sansetsu.

== Collection highlights ==
=== Arabic collection ===
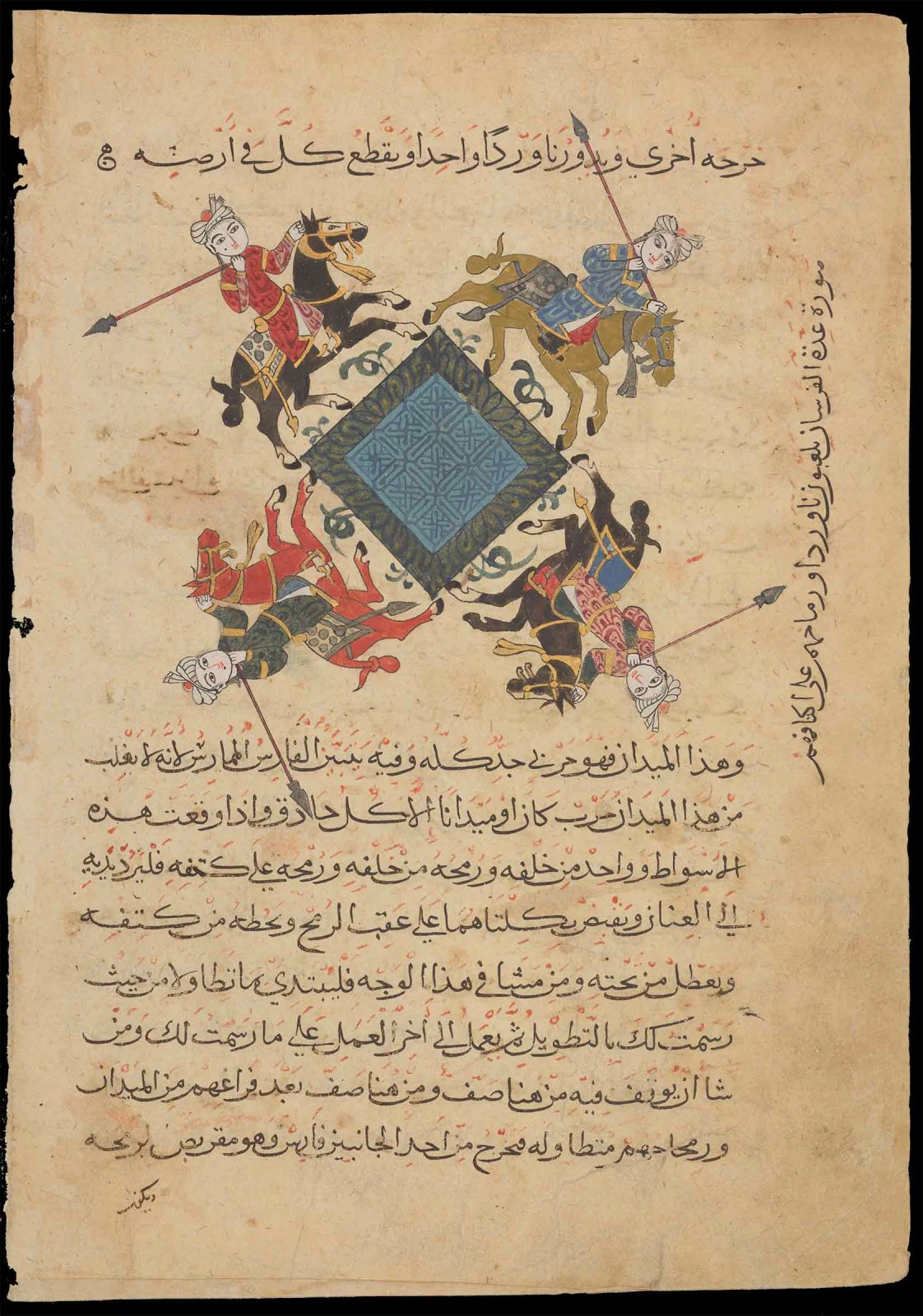
'Manual on the Arts of Horsemanship' by al-Aqsara'i. Cairo, 1366.

=== Armenian collection ===
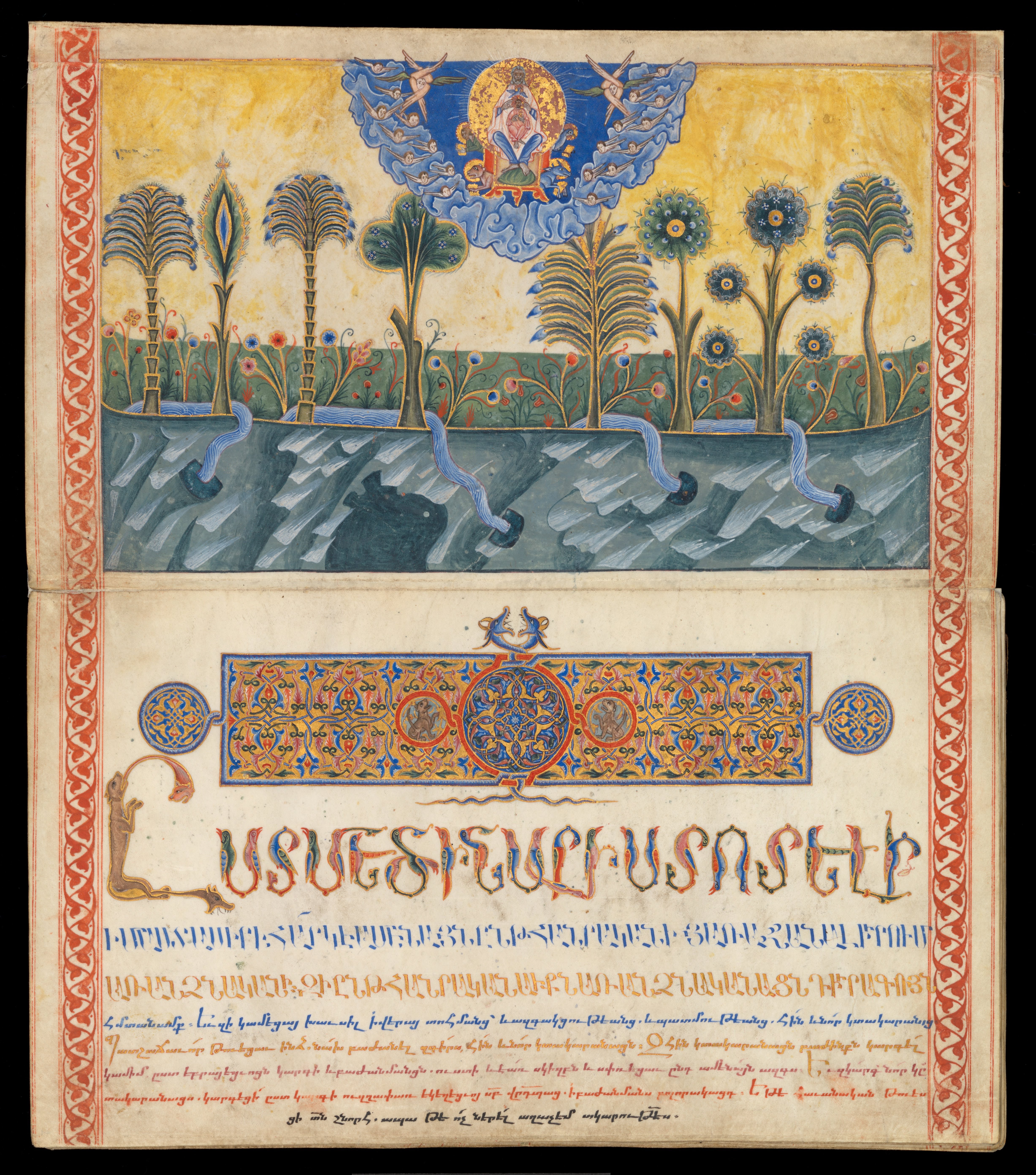
Serapion of Edessa's Abridged Bible. Amida, 1601

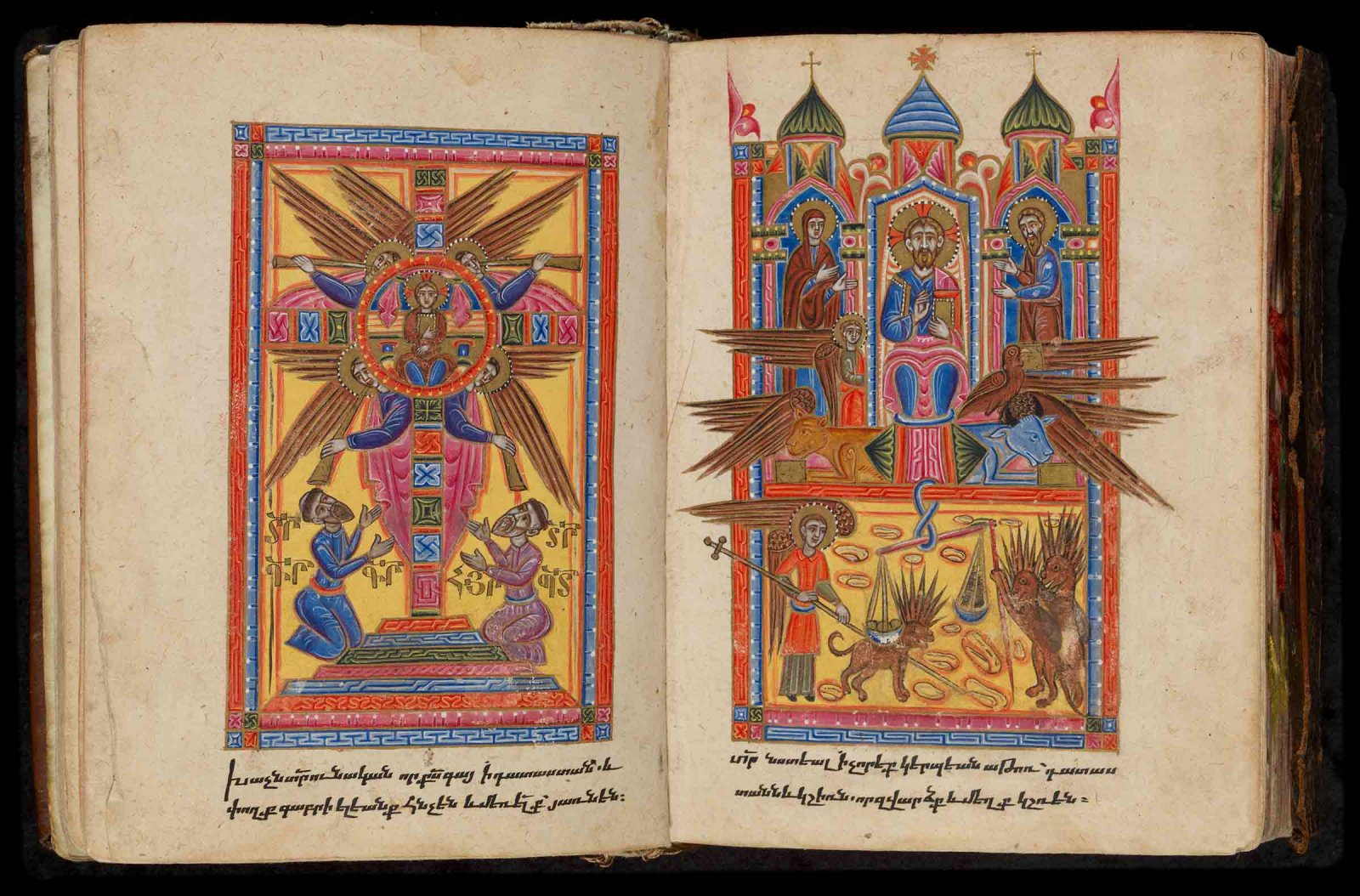
Armenian Gospel Book made in Isfahan in 1655

=== Biblical papyri collection ===
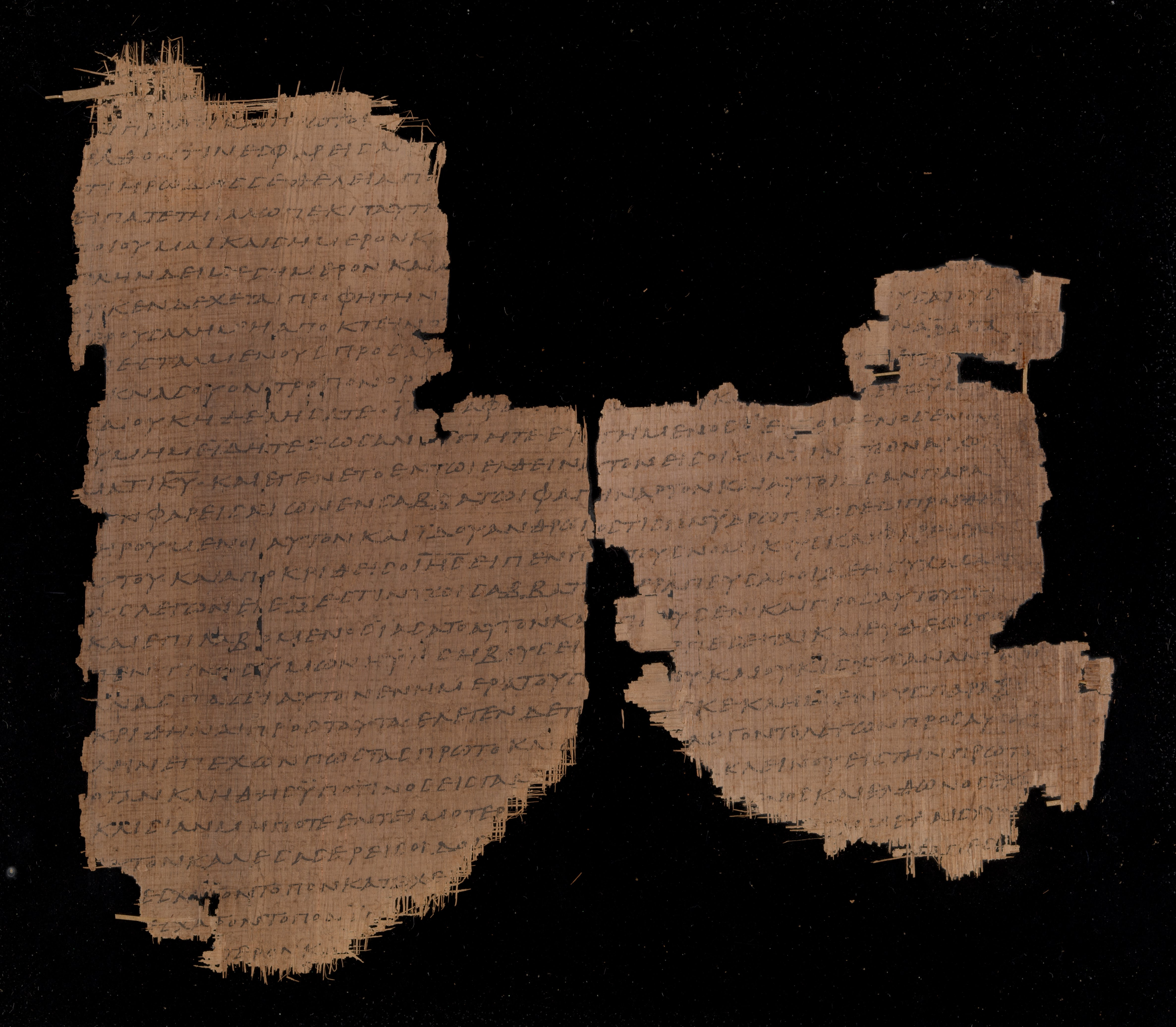
Papyrus 45

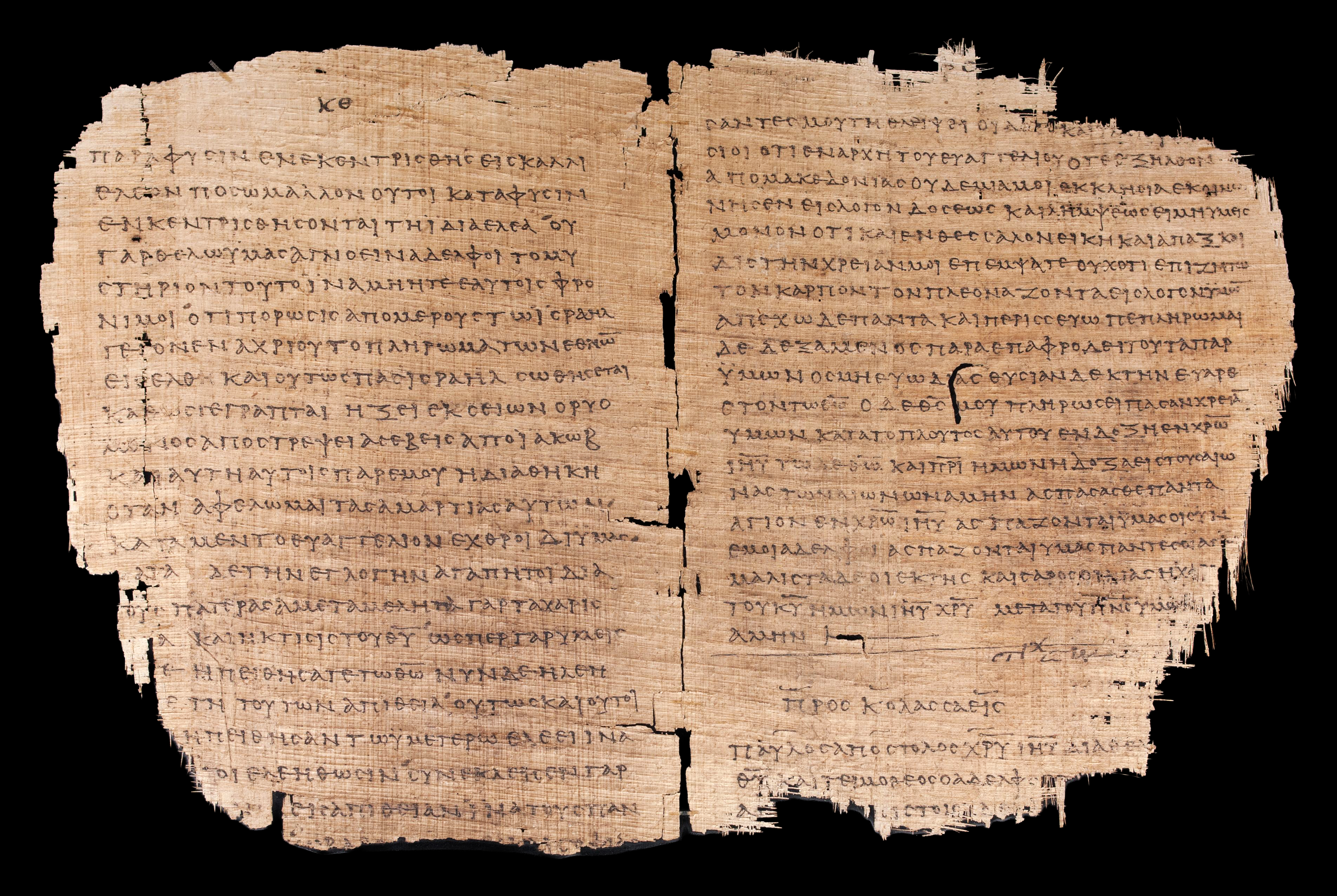
Fragments of Papyrus 46

=== Burmese collection ===
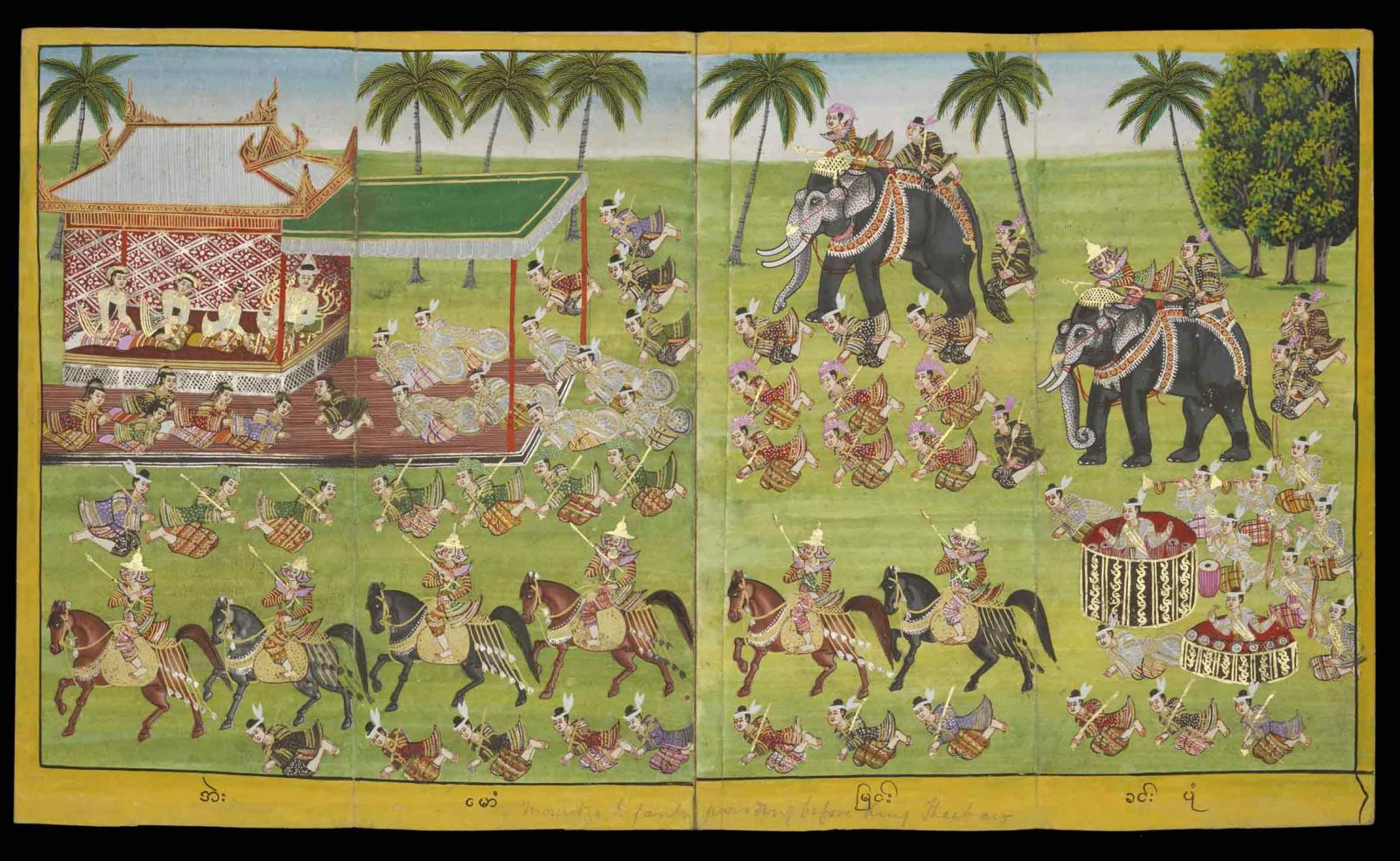
Court amusements and ceremonies. Myanmar, 19th century

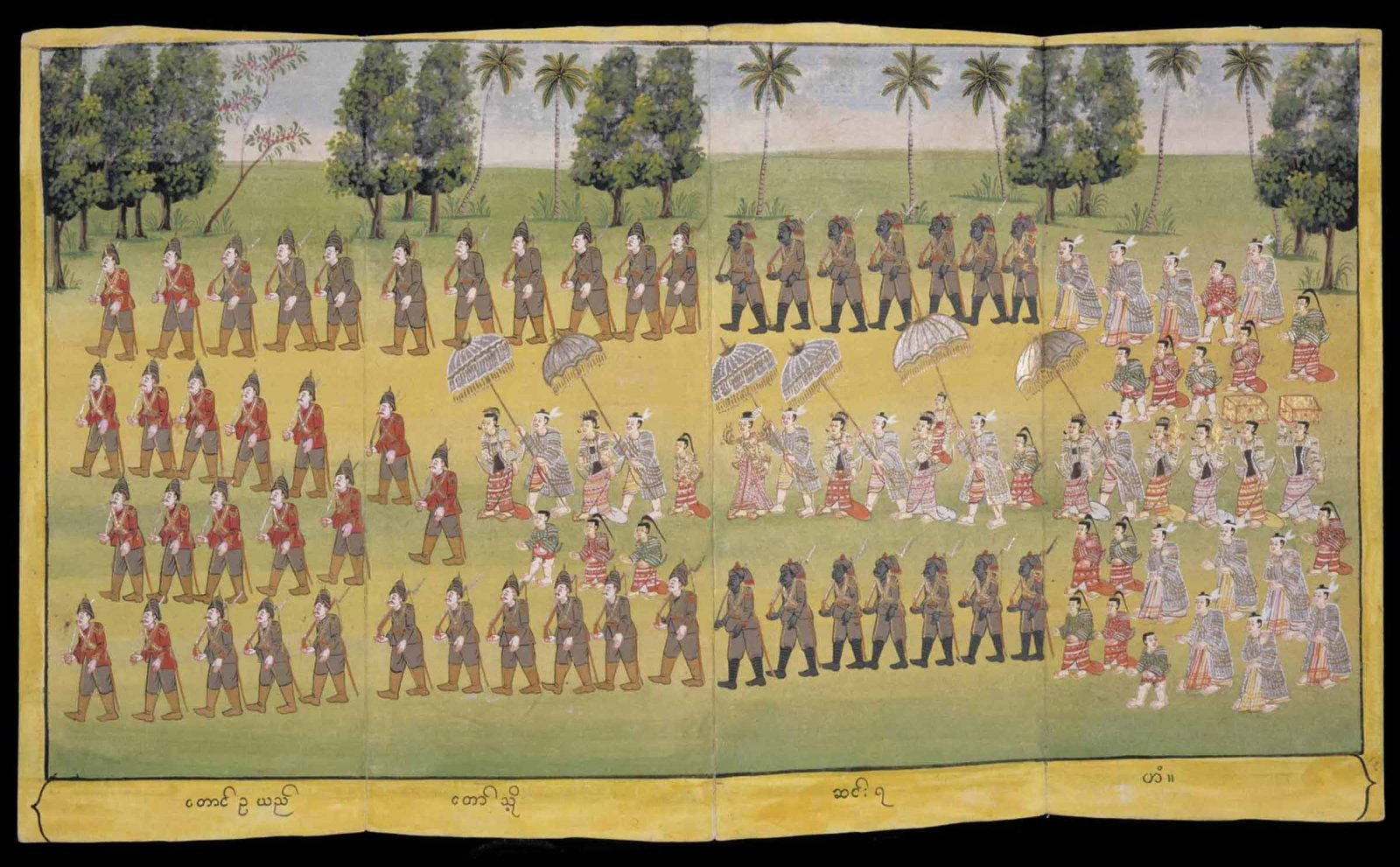
Court amusements and ceremonies. Myanmar, after 1885

=== Chinese collection ===
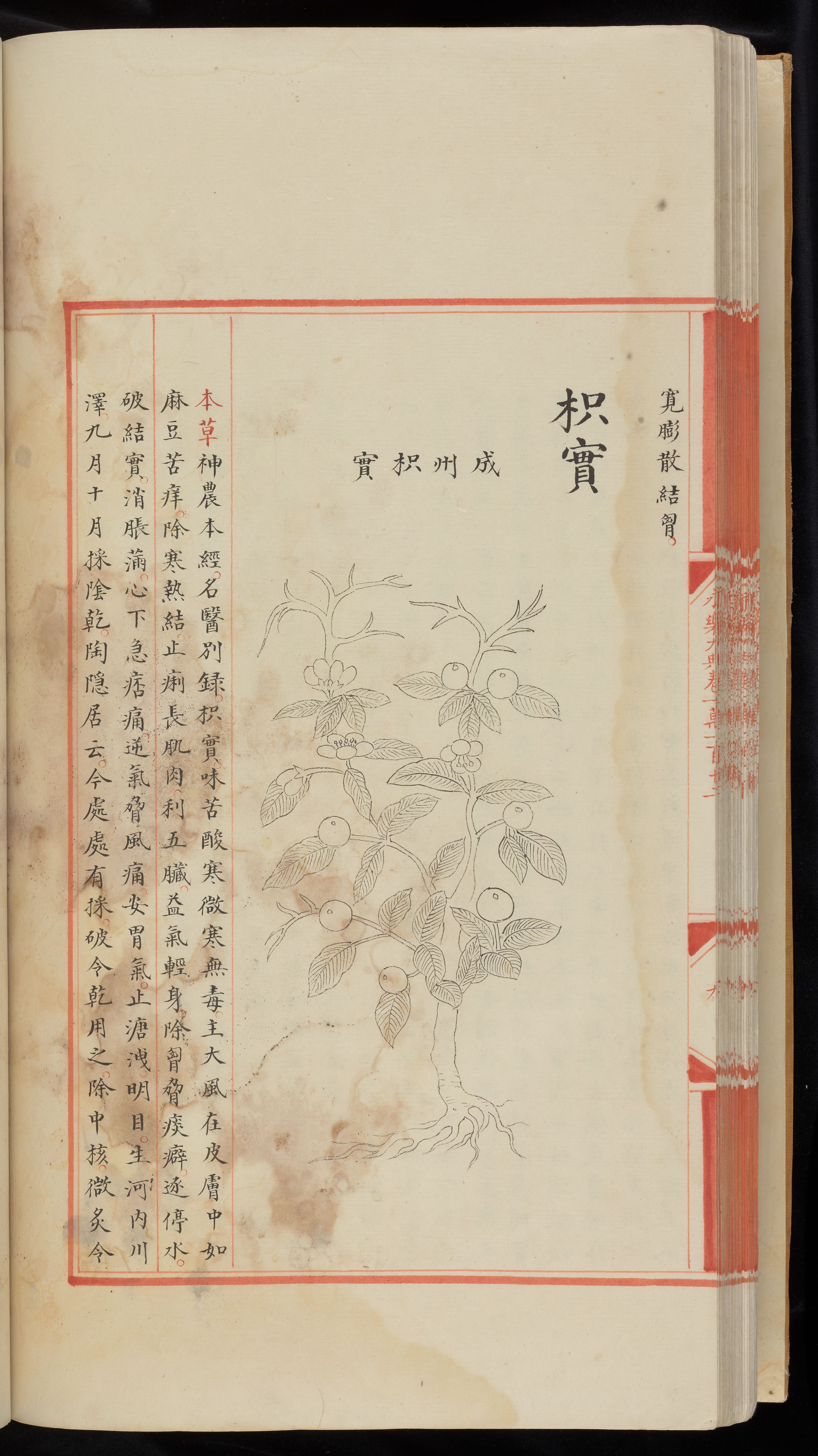
Chapters 10,110 to 10,112 of the 'Great encyclopaedia of the Yongle Reign'

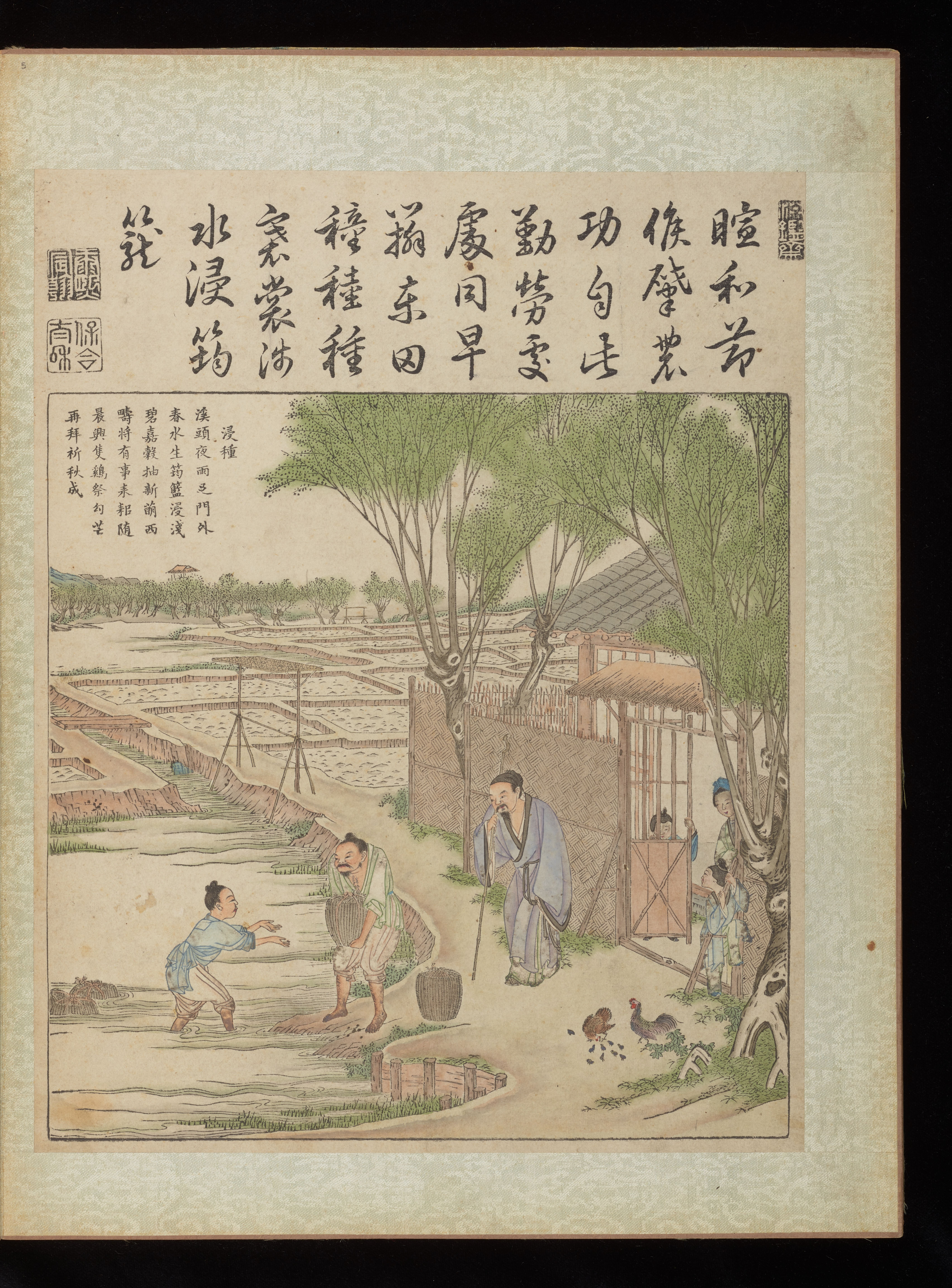
Imperially commissioned illustrations of agriculture and sericulture. Woodblock print by Zhu Gui after designs by Jiao Bingzhen. 1696

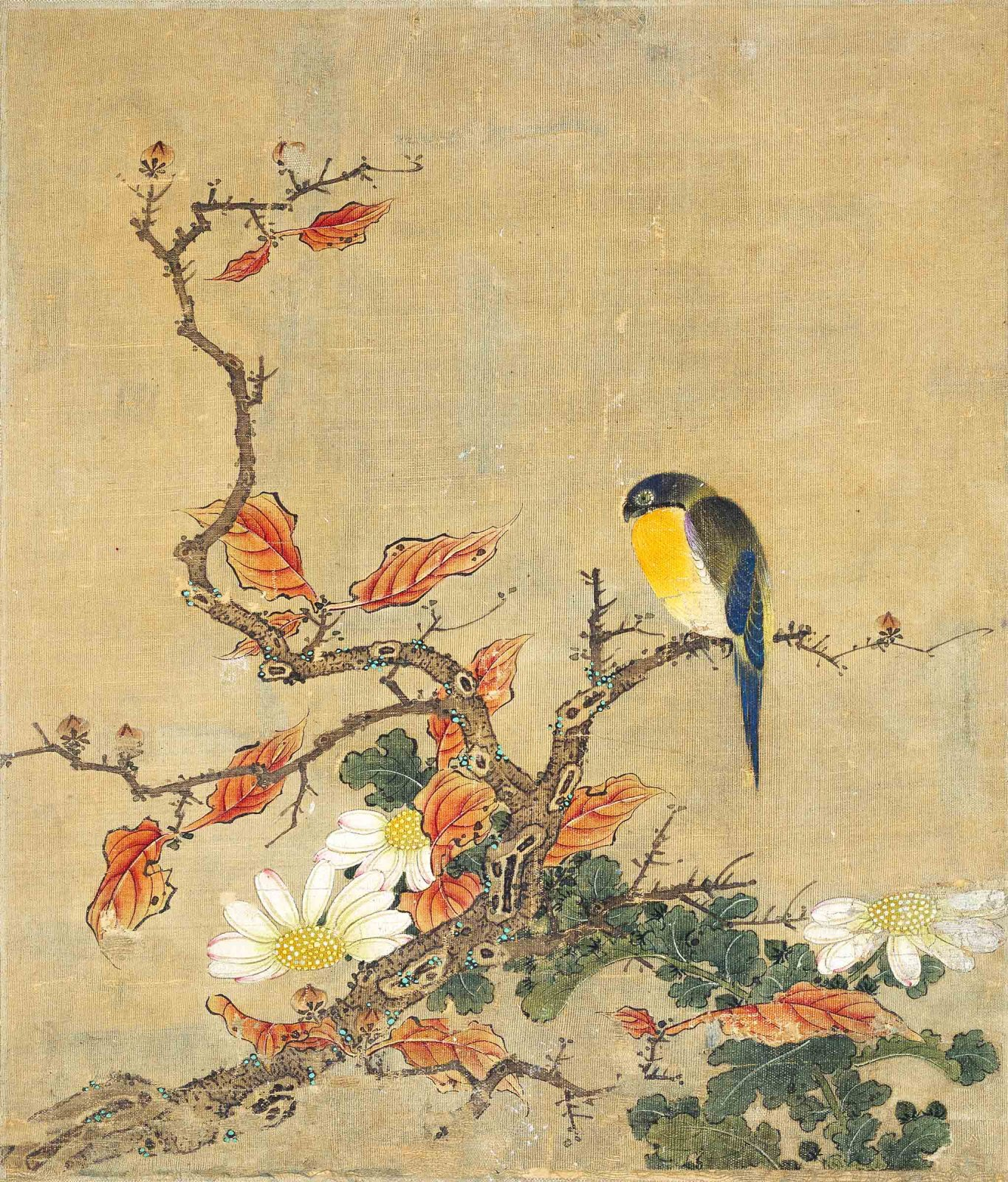
Paintings of birds and flowers by Hu Mei. 18th century

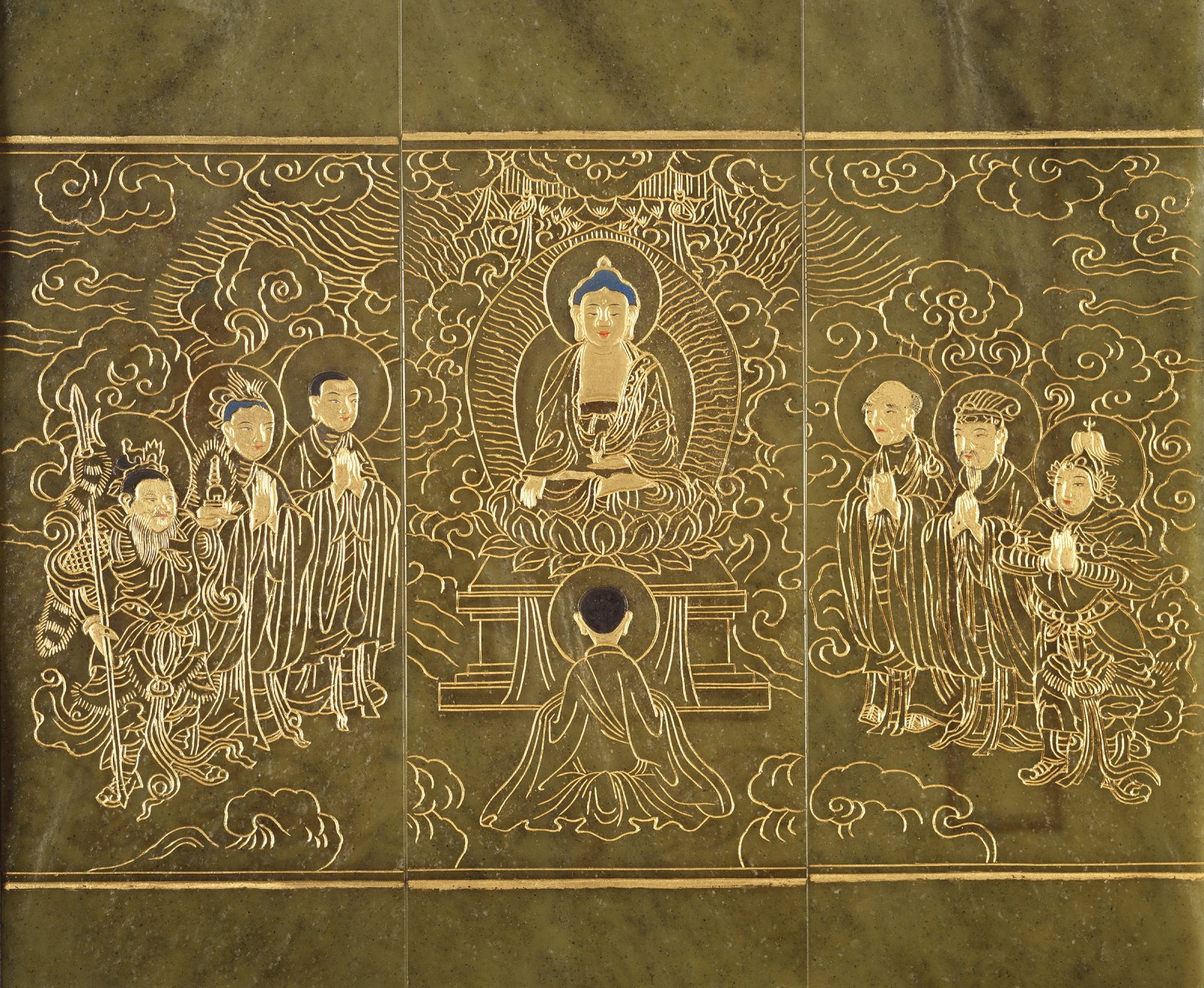
'Diamond Sutra' written in Chinese, engraved and gilded on fifty-three folios of nephrite jade. 1732

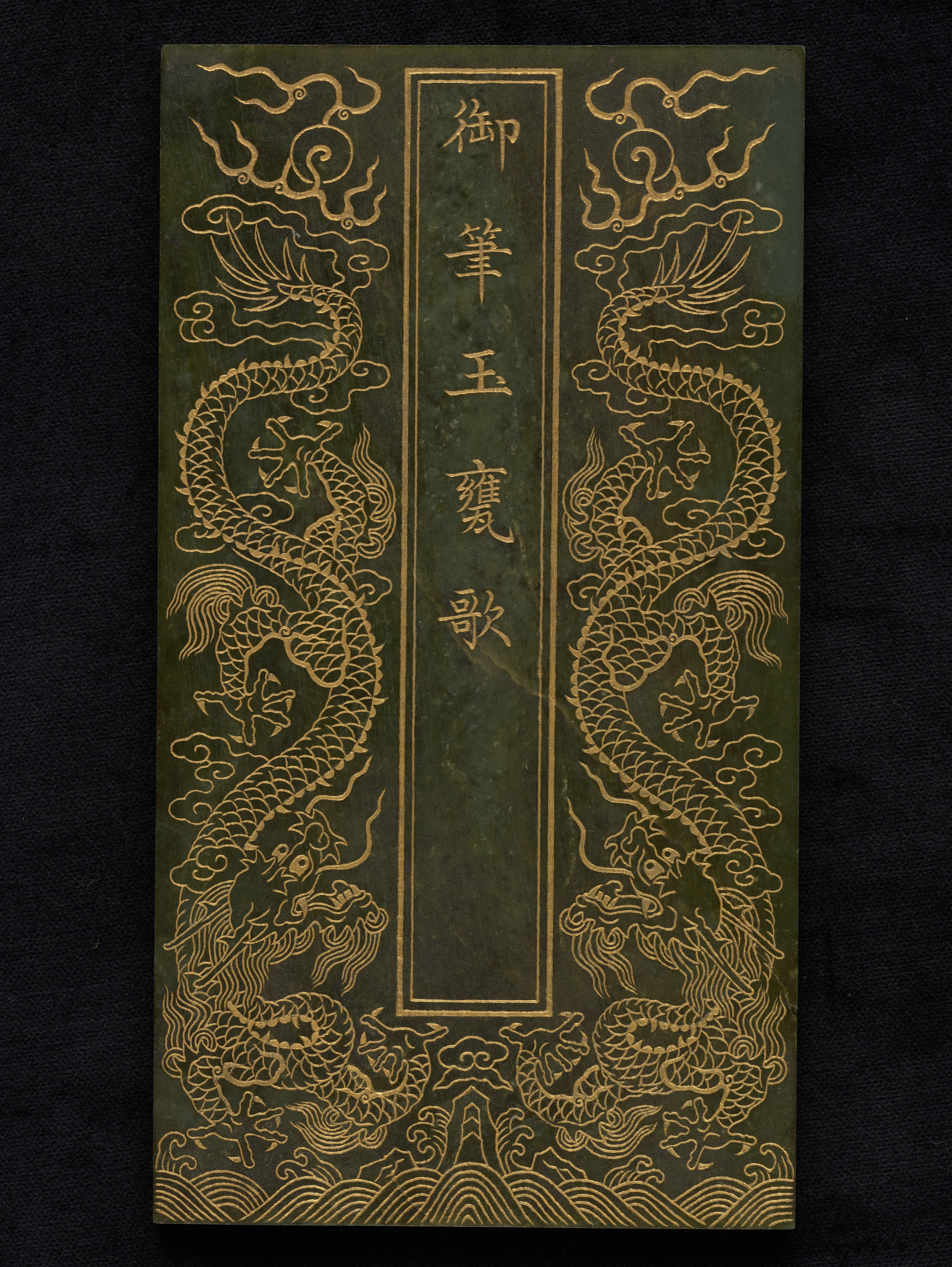
'Song of the jade bowl written by the imperial brush (Yubi yu weng ge)'. 1745

'South façade of the Palace of Harmonious Delights (Xieqiqu nanmian)'. After drawing by Yi Lantai. Between 1781 and 1787

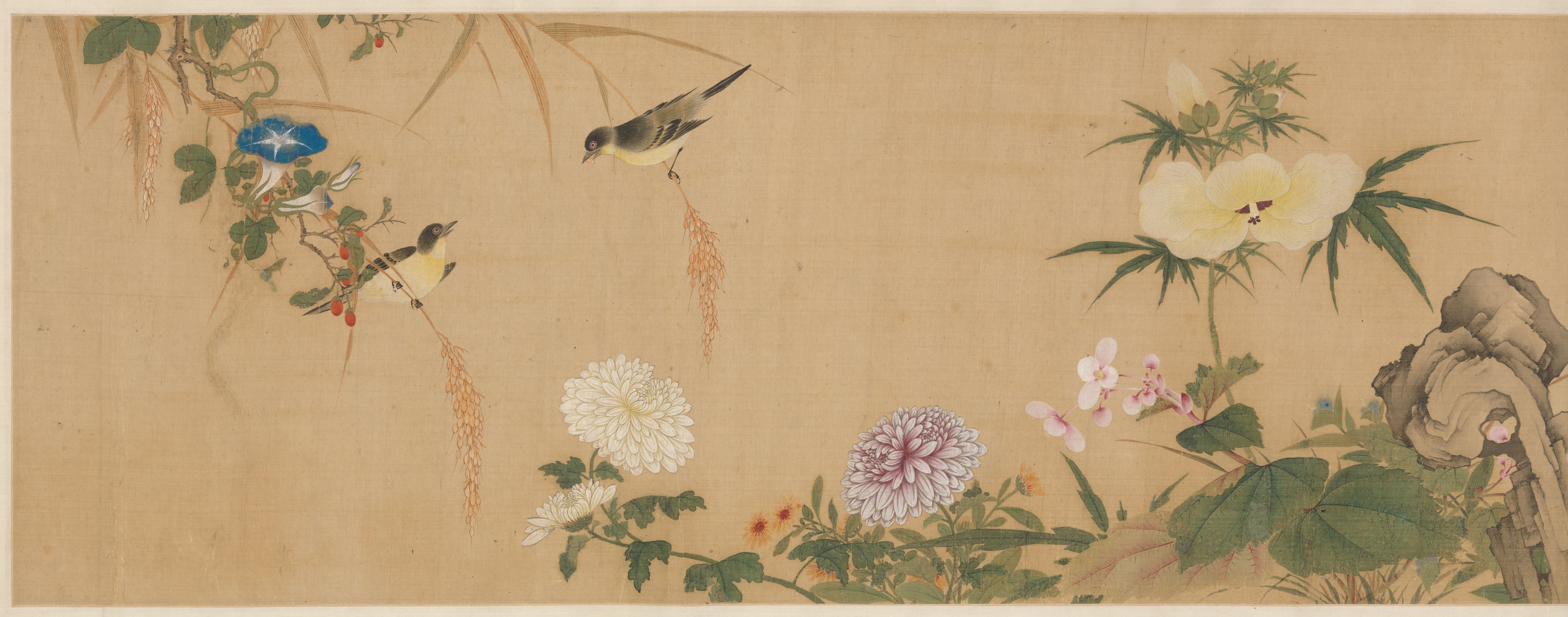
Handscroll of birds and flowers. Circa 1800

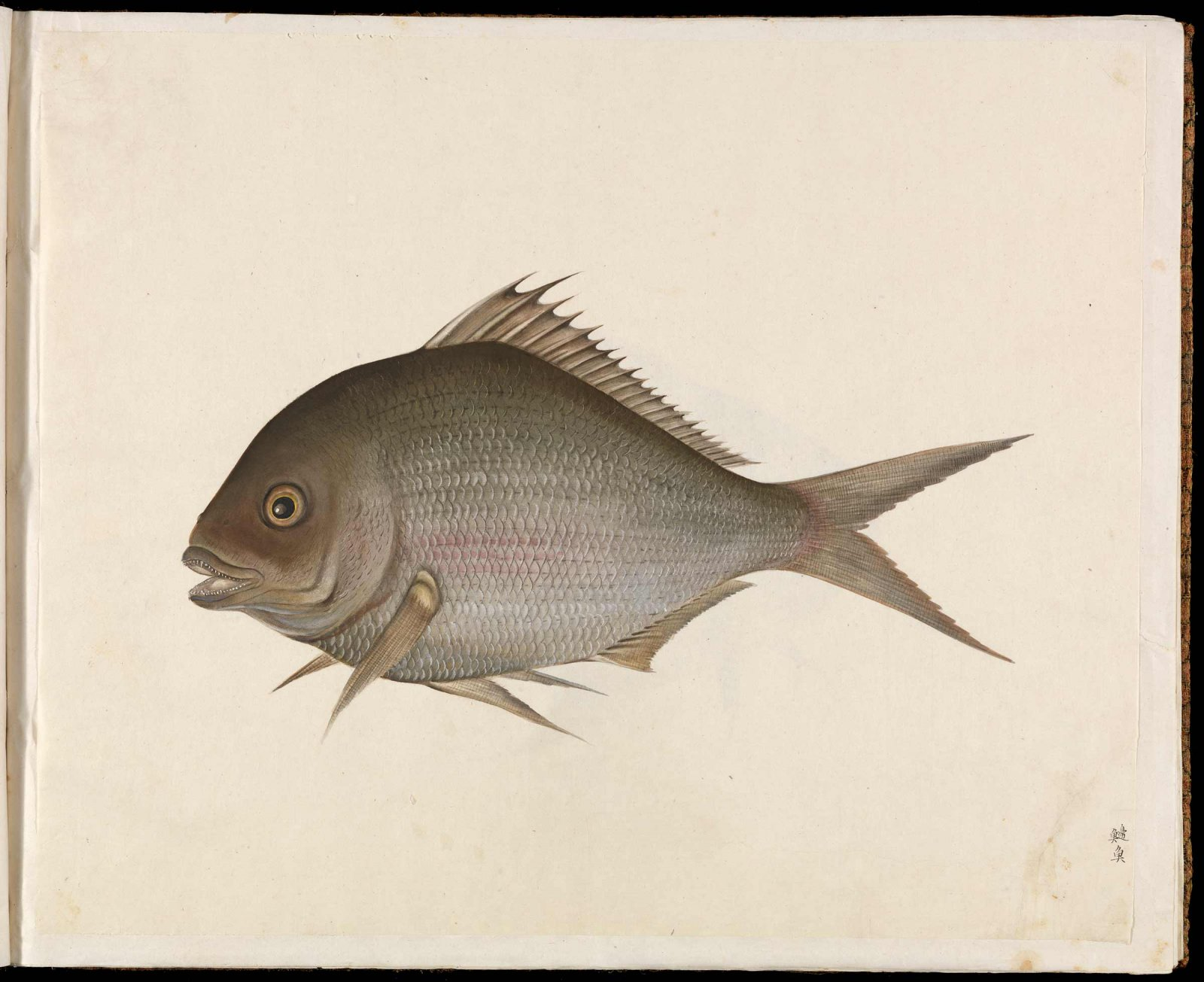
Paintings of insects and fish. Early 19th century

=== Coptic collection ===
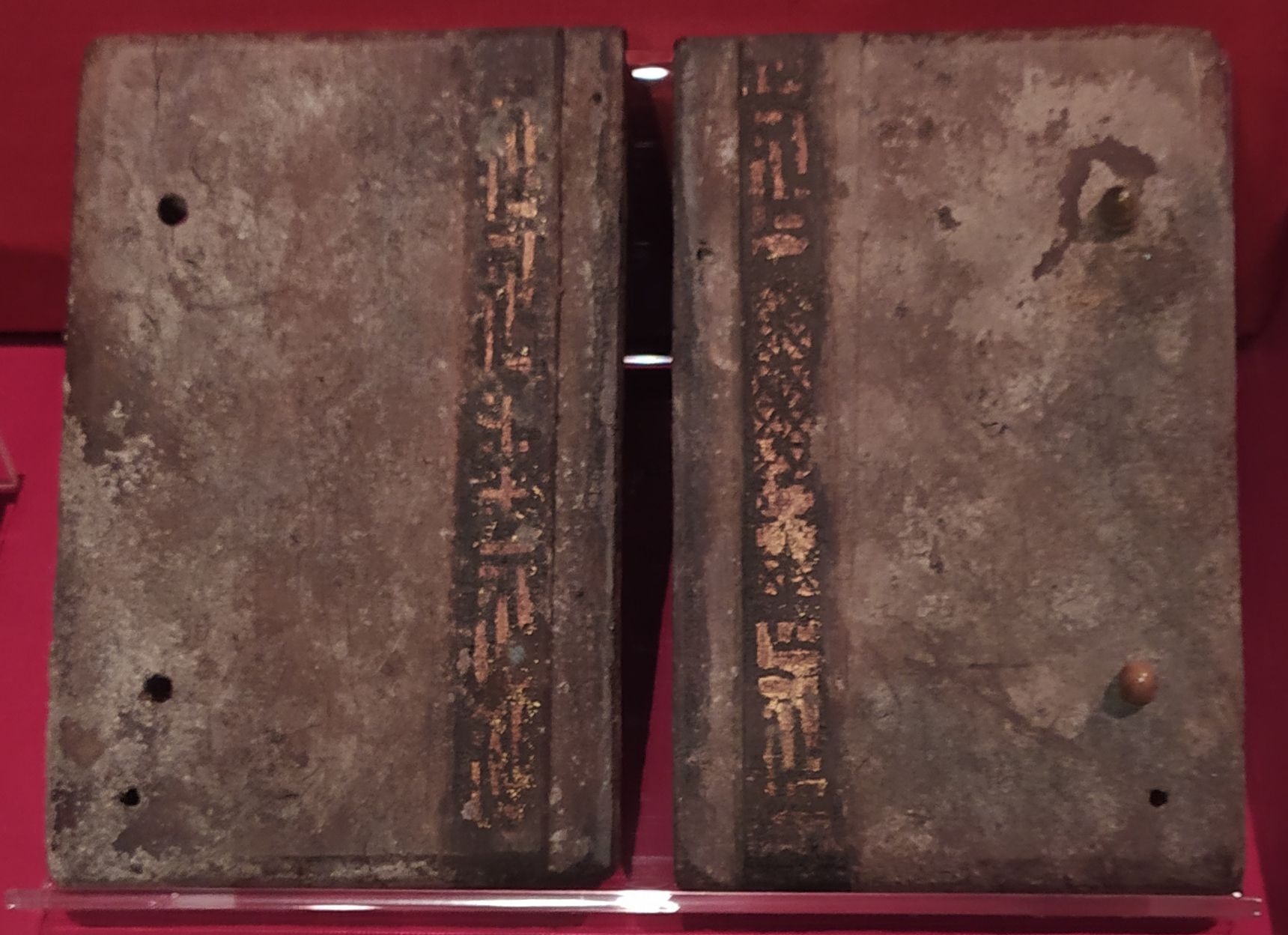
Wooden boards. Egypt, Third century

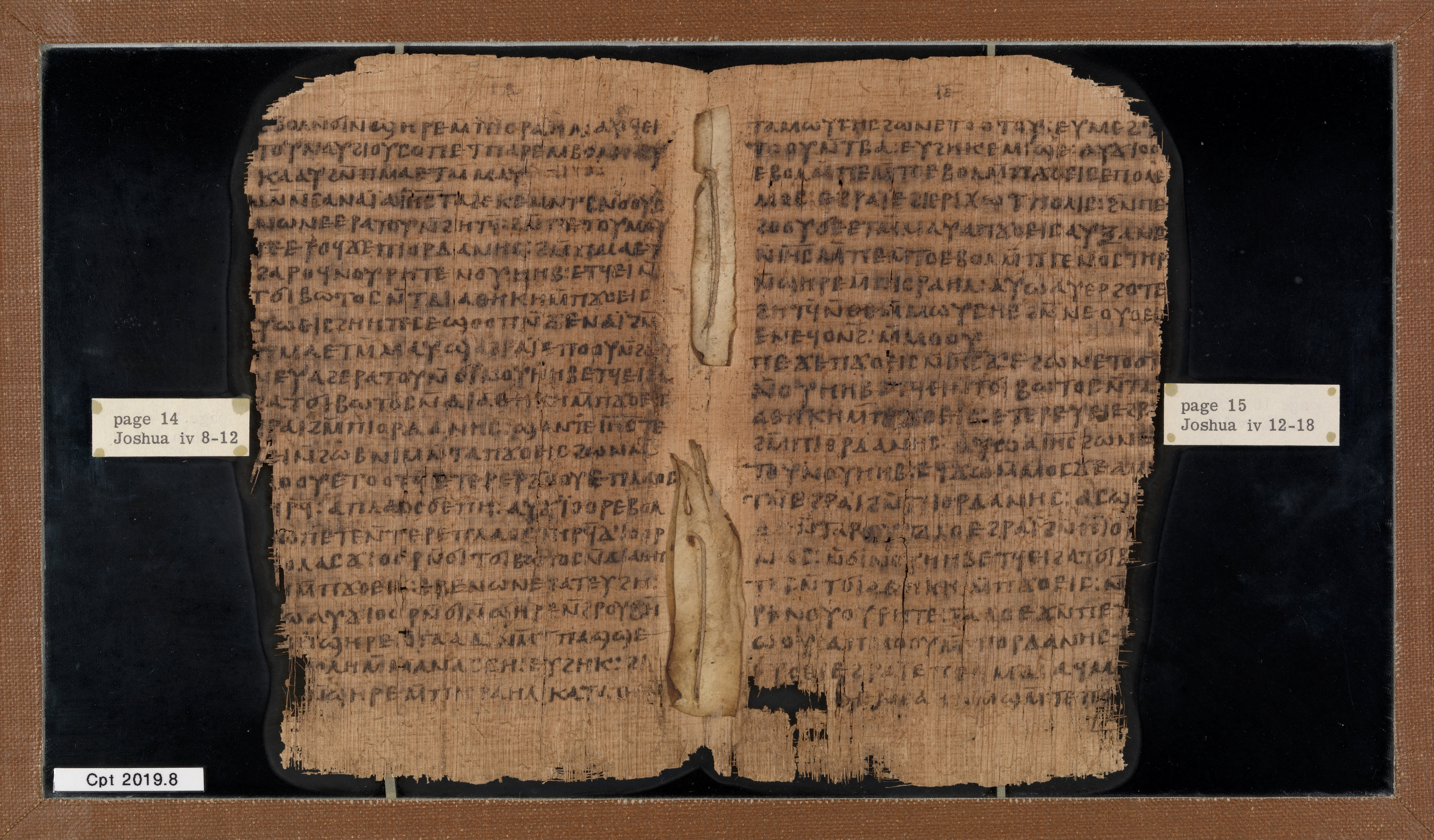
Papyrus with the fragments of the Book of Joshua. Egypt, 4th century

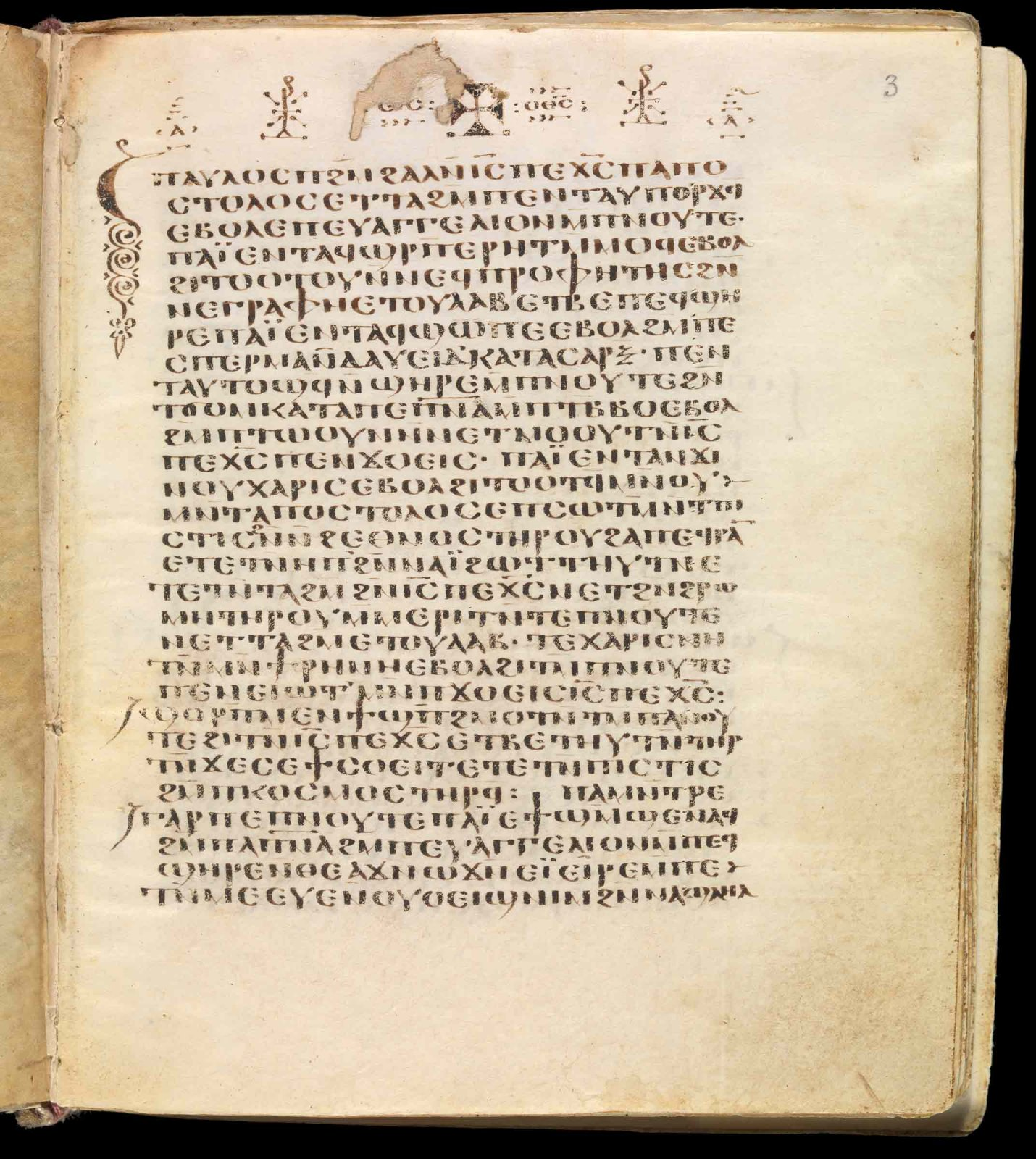
Coptic manuscript of the 'Pauline Epistles & Gospel of John'. Egypt, circa 600

=== Egyptian Papyrus collection ===
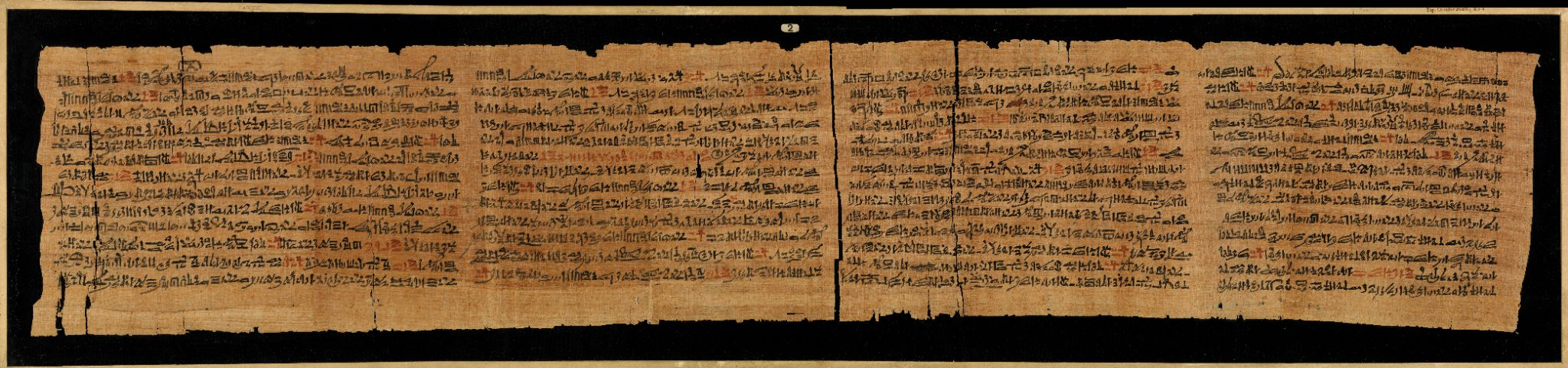
Manuscript of 'Contendings of Horus and Seth'

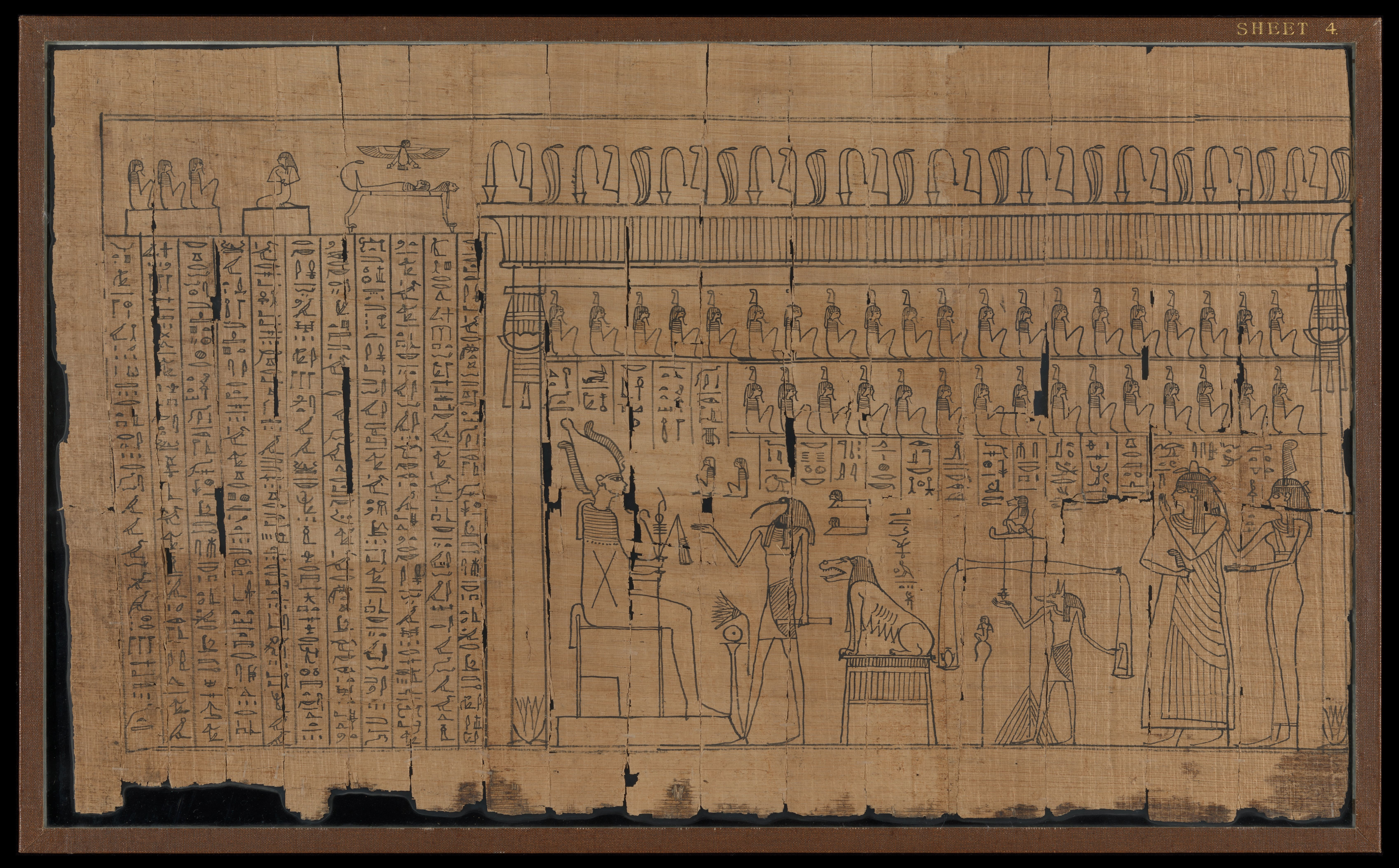
Book of the Dead of Lady Neskhons. Egypt, c. 300 BC

=== Ethiopian collection ===
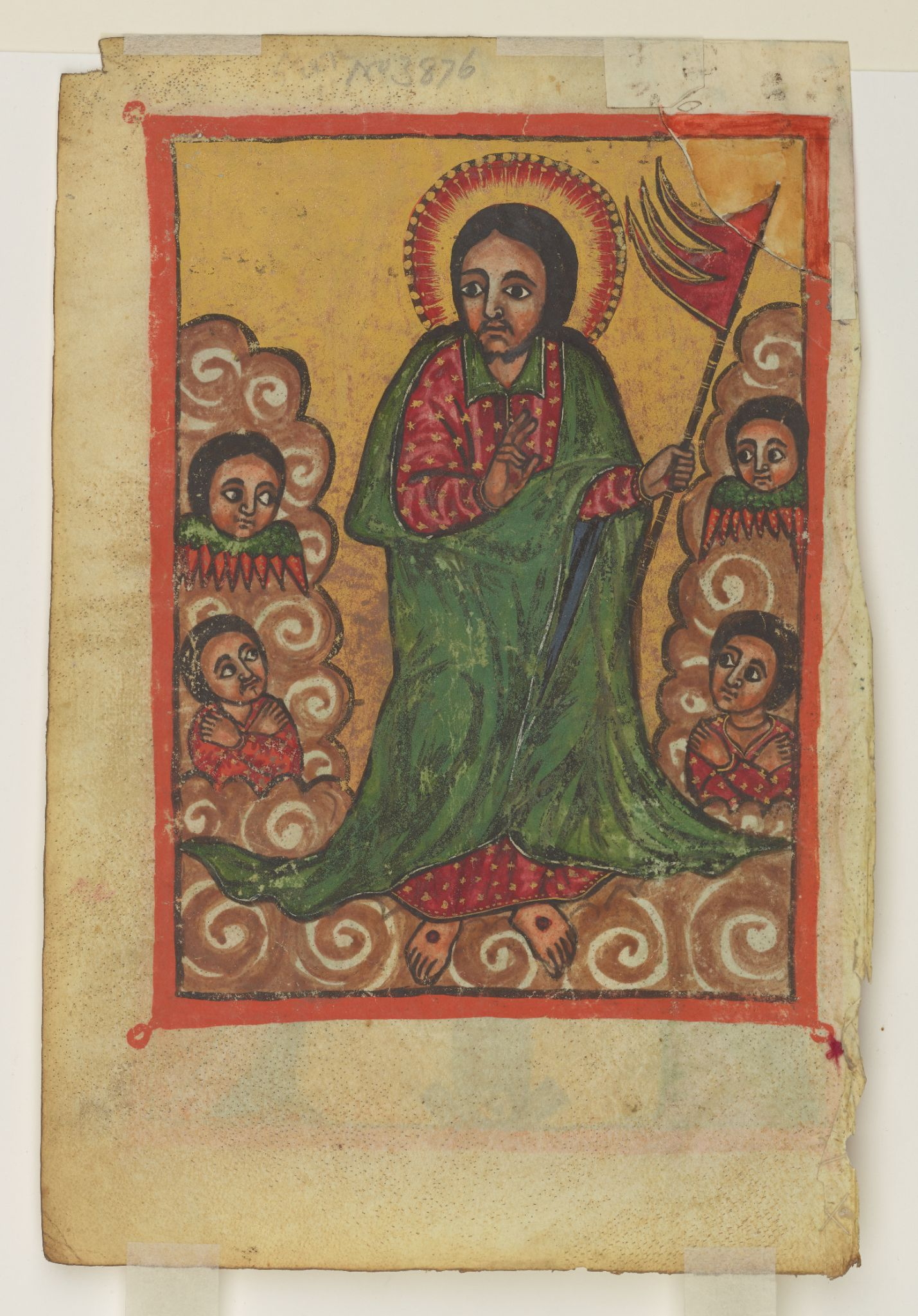
The Resurrection. From an Ethiopian prayer book. 17th or early 18th century

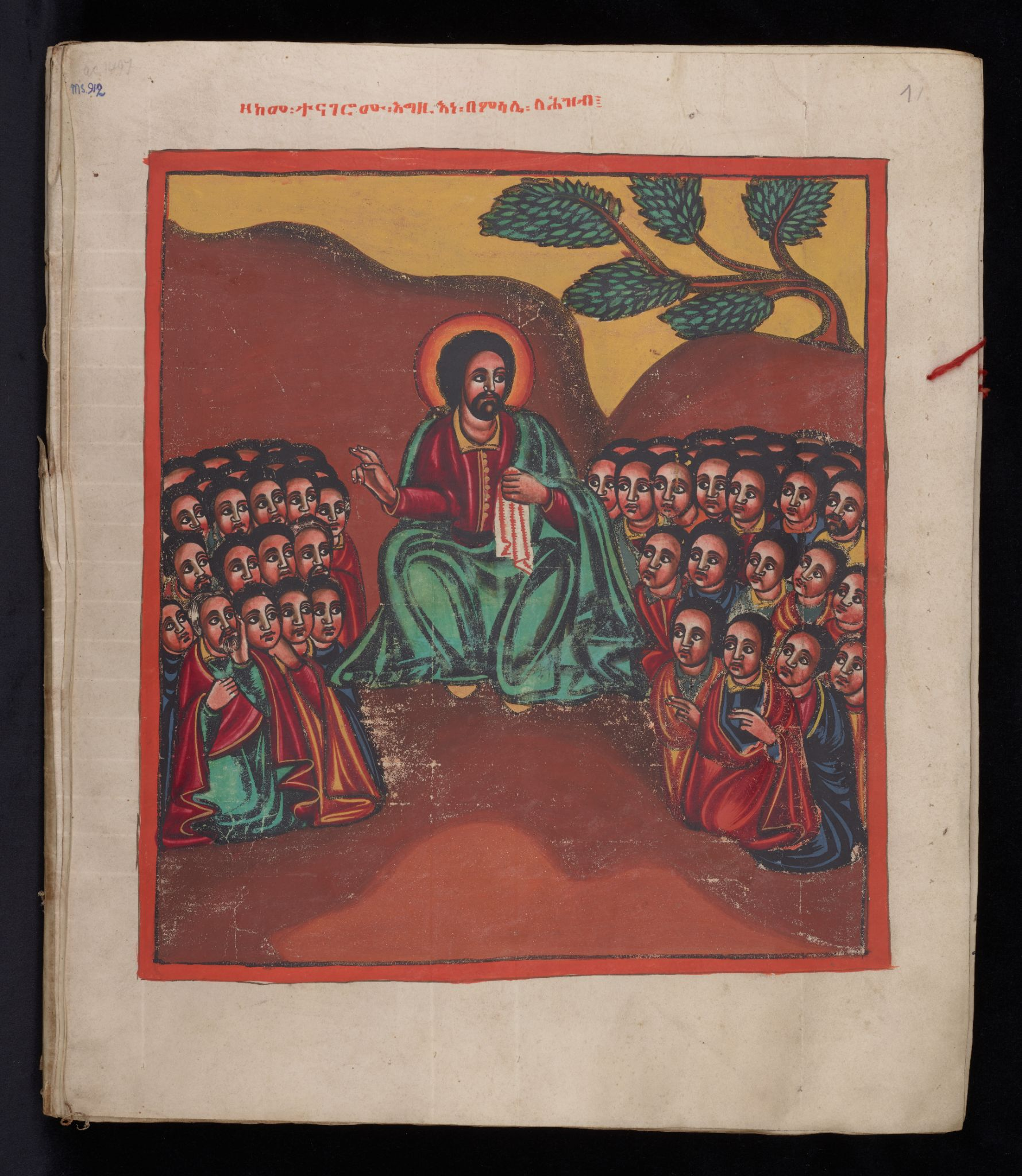
Gospels of Matthew and Mark in Geʽez. 18th century

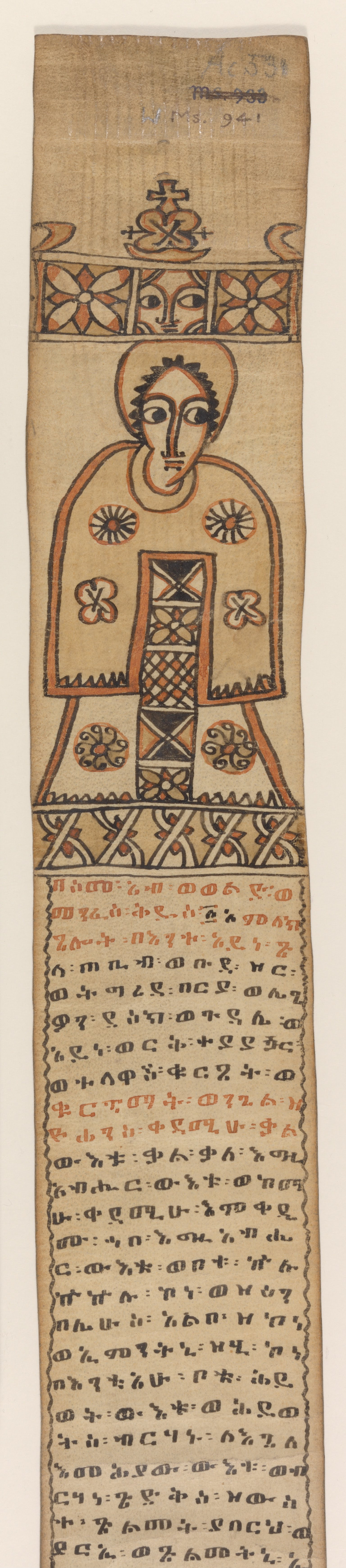
Scroll containing magical prayers to protect against evil in Geʽez. 19th century.

=== Hebrew collection ===
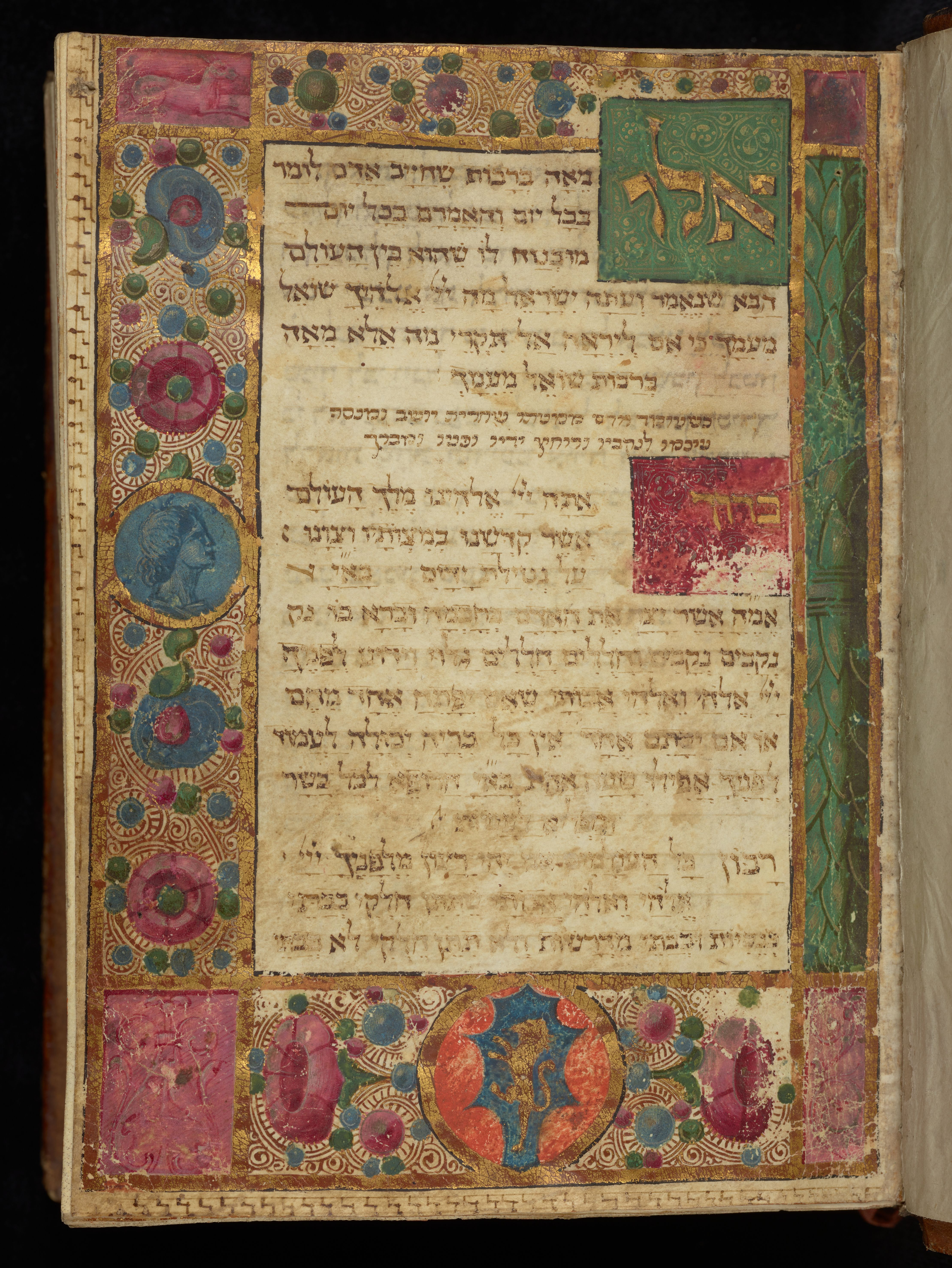
Machzor written on parchment in Hebrew in an Italian square script. Italy, 14th or 15th century

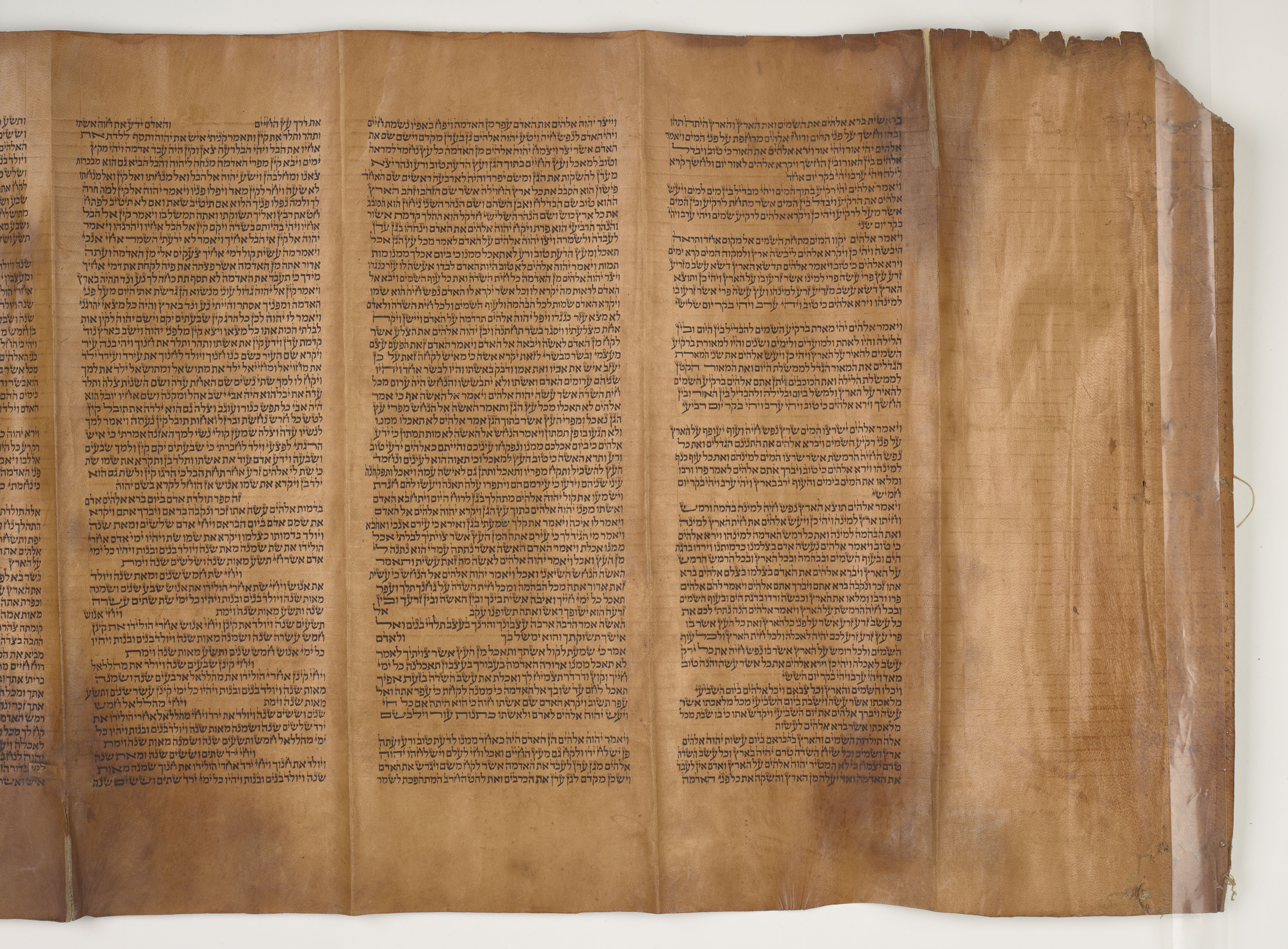
Sefer Torah on parchment written in Hebrew in a Sefardic square script in the 18th century.

=== Indian collection ===
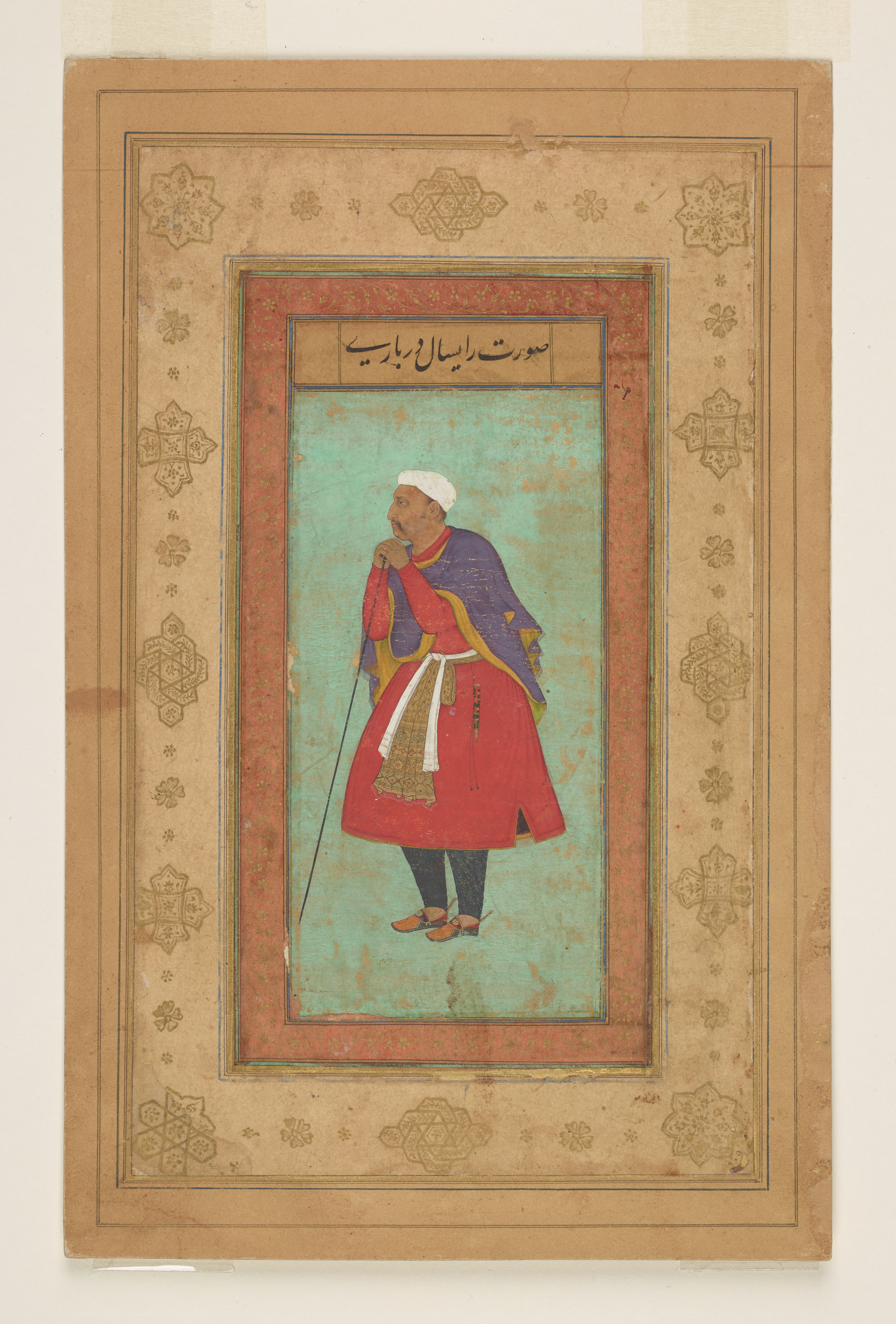
Portrait of Raisal Darbari. Allahabad, circa 1600-1605

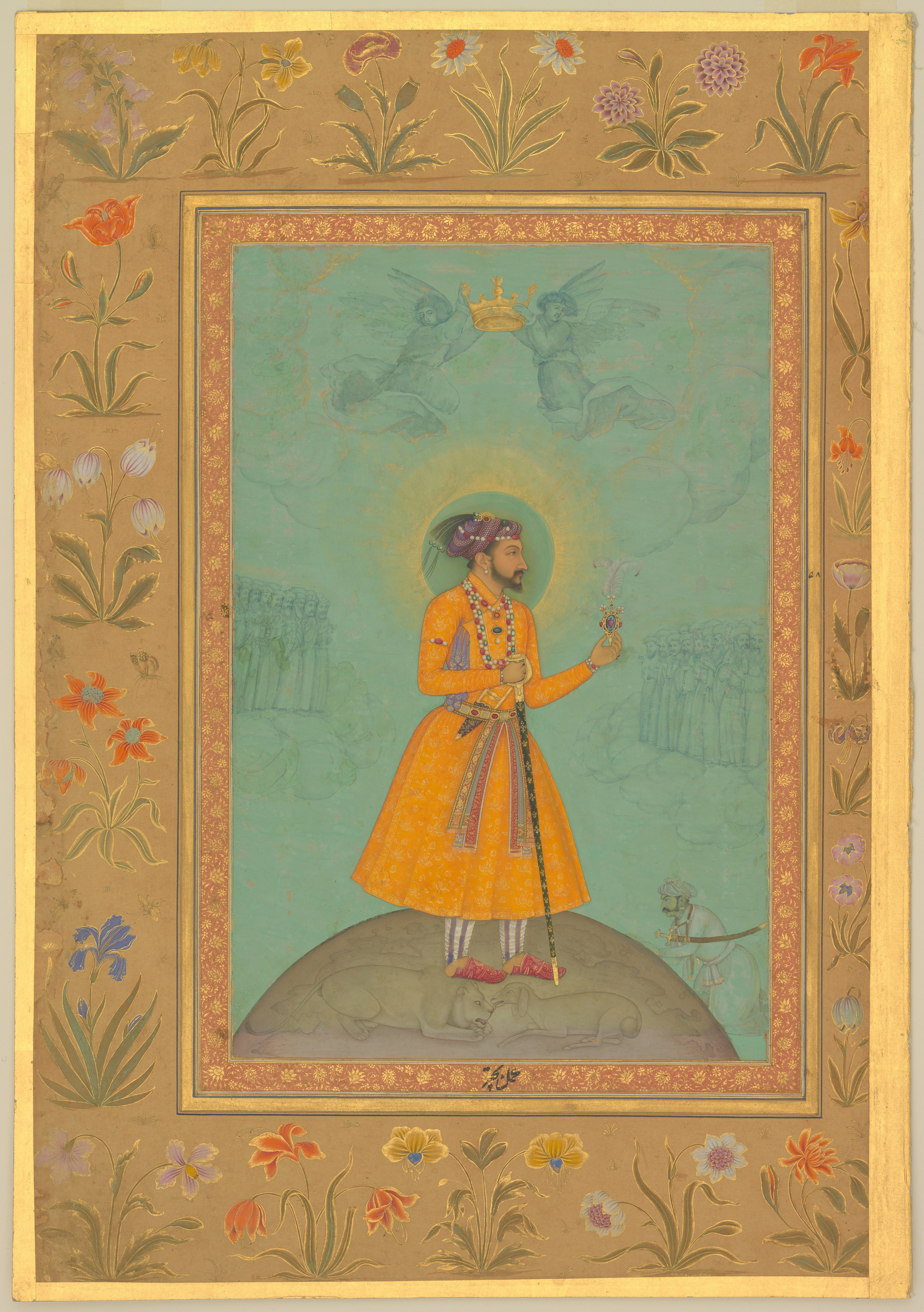
Jujhar Singh Bundela kneels in submission to Shah Jahan by Bichitr, circa 1630

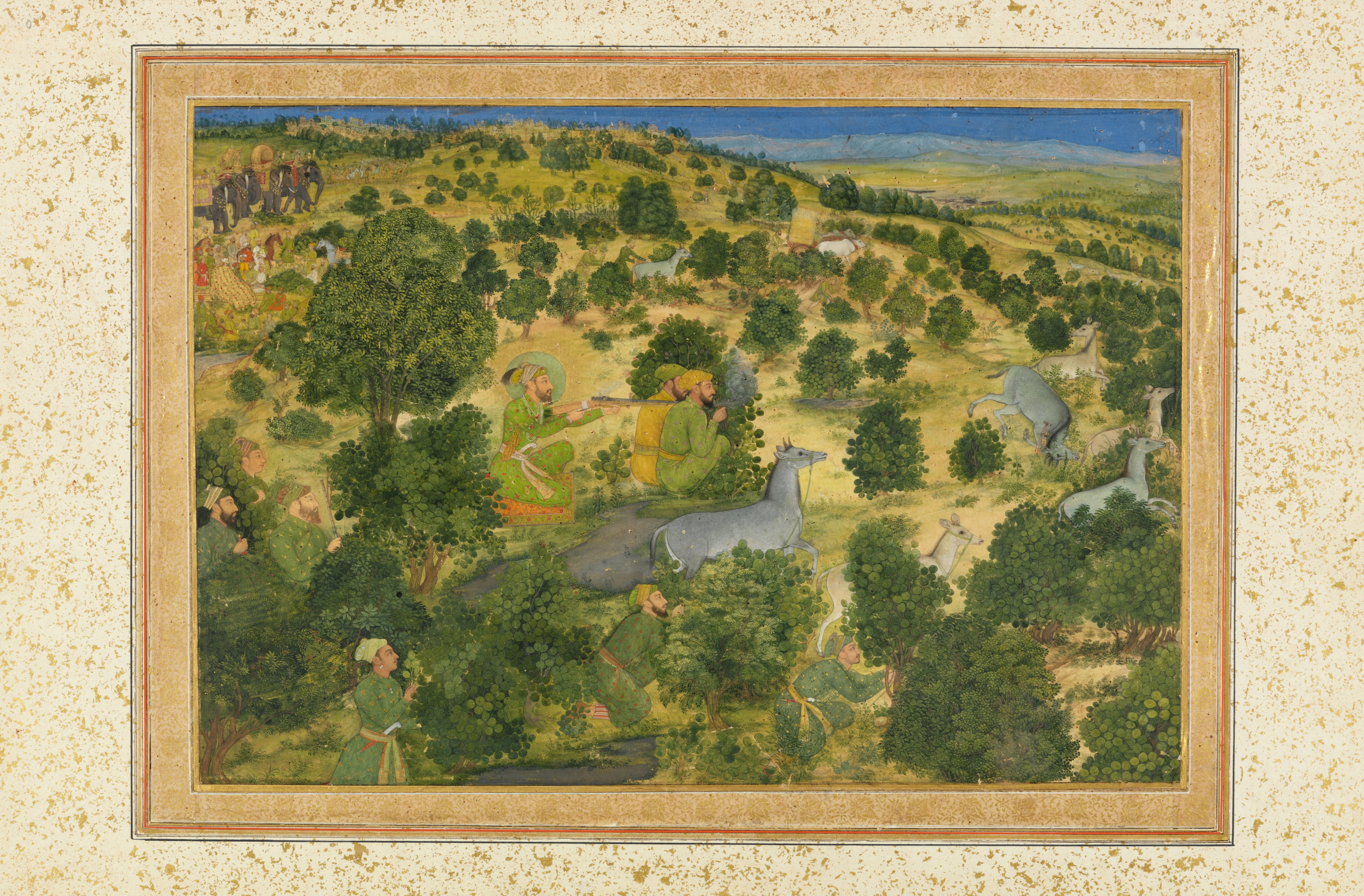
Awrangzib Hunts Nilgais. Circa 1660

Women on a palace terrace with a panoramic view. Faizabad, 1770

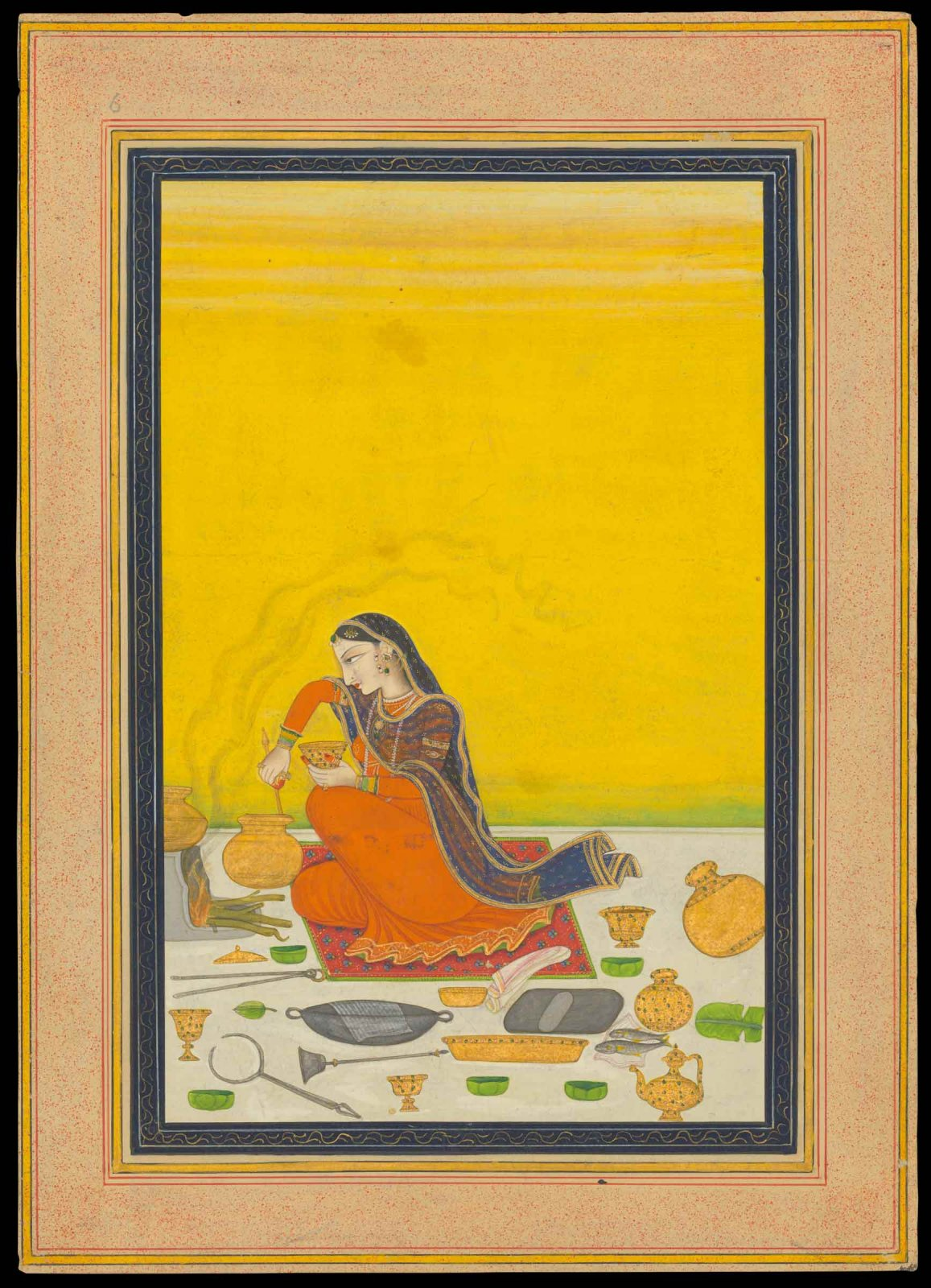
A woman preparing a meal. Kangra, c. 1810

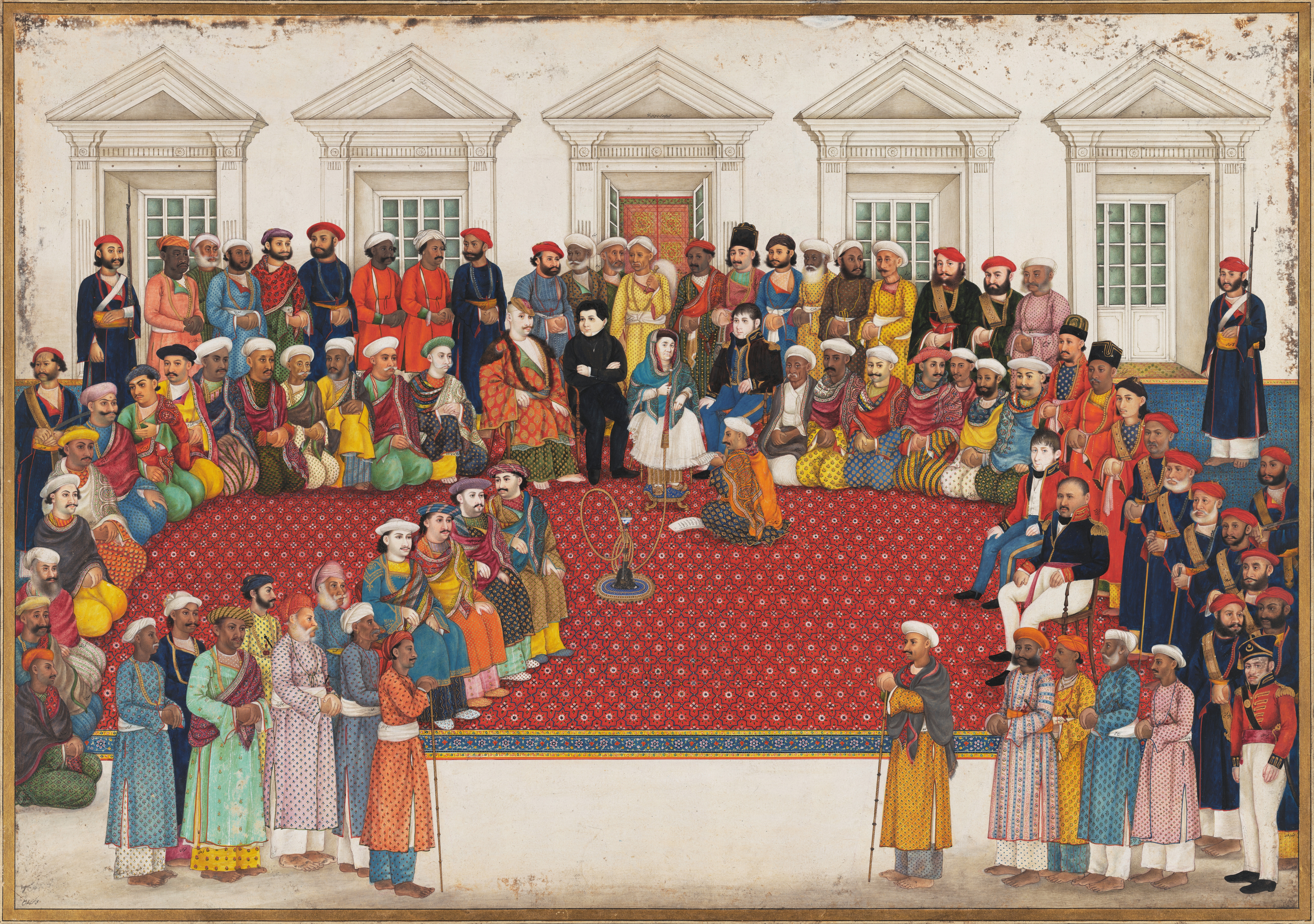
Begum Samru and her household by Muhammad A'zam. Delhi, c. 1820

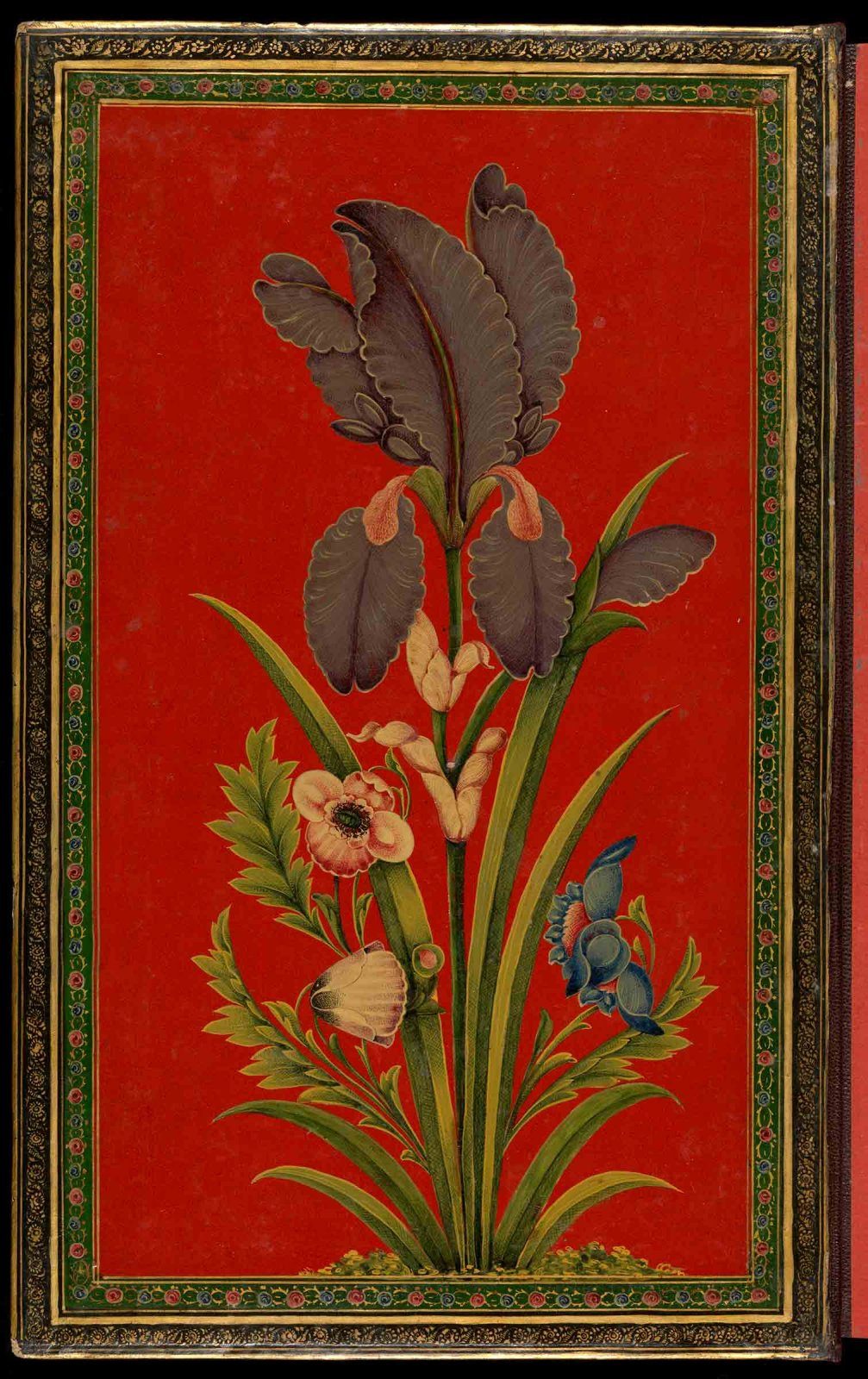
Iris, painted lacquer album cover. Delhi, c. 1850

=== Indian (non-Mughal) collection ===
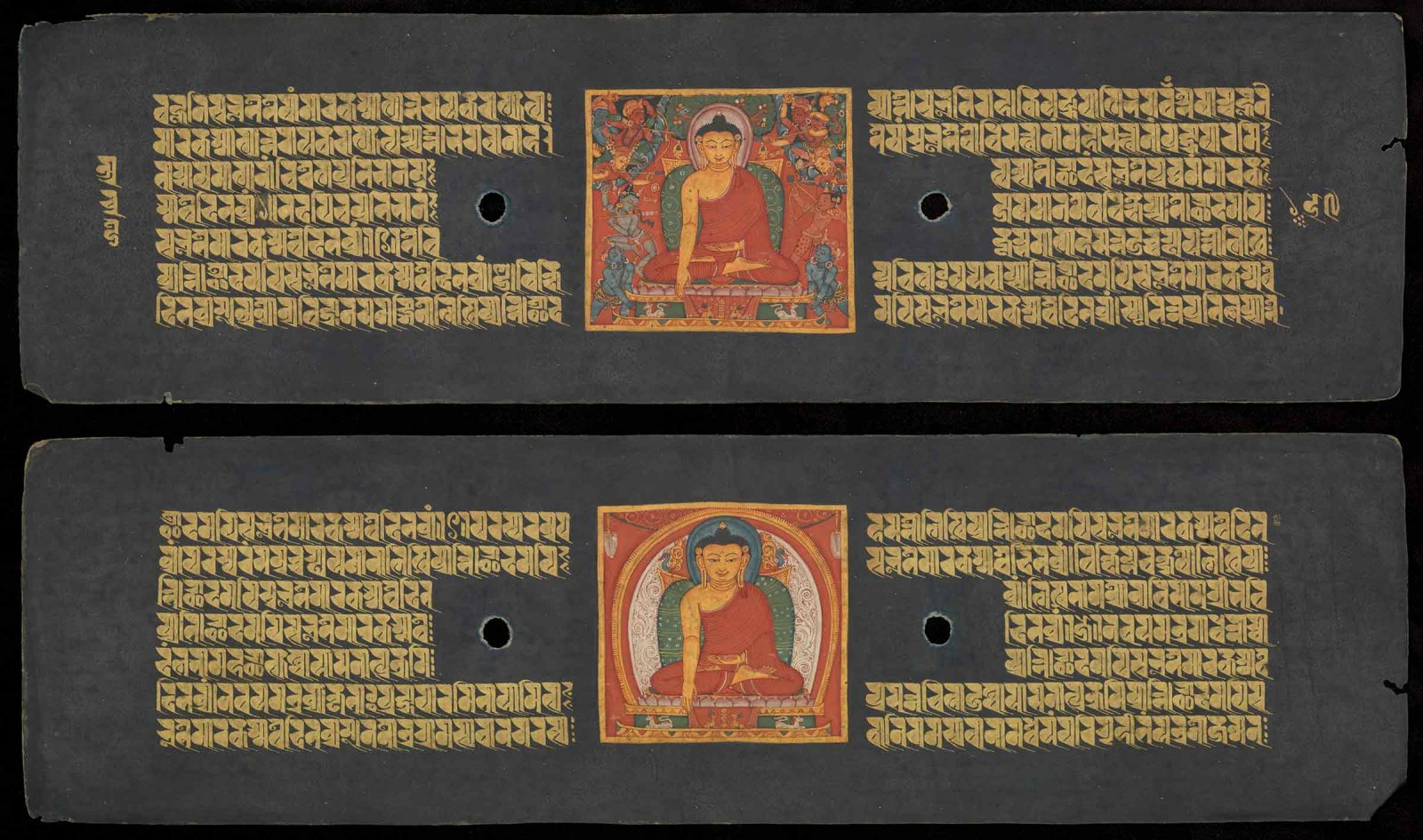
Manuscript of the Aṣṭasāhasrikā Prajñāpāramitā Sūtra. Nepal, 1317

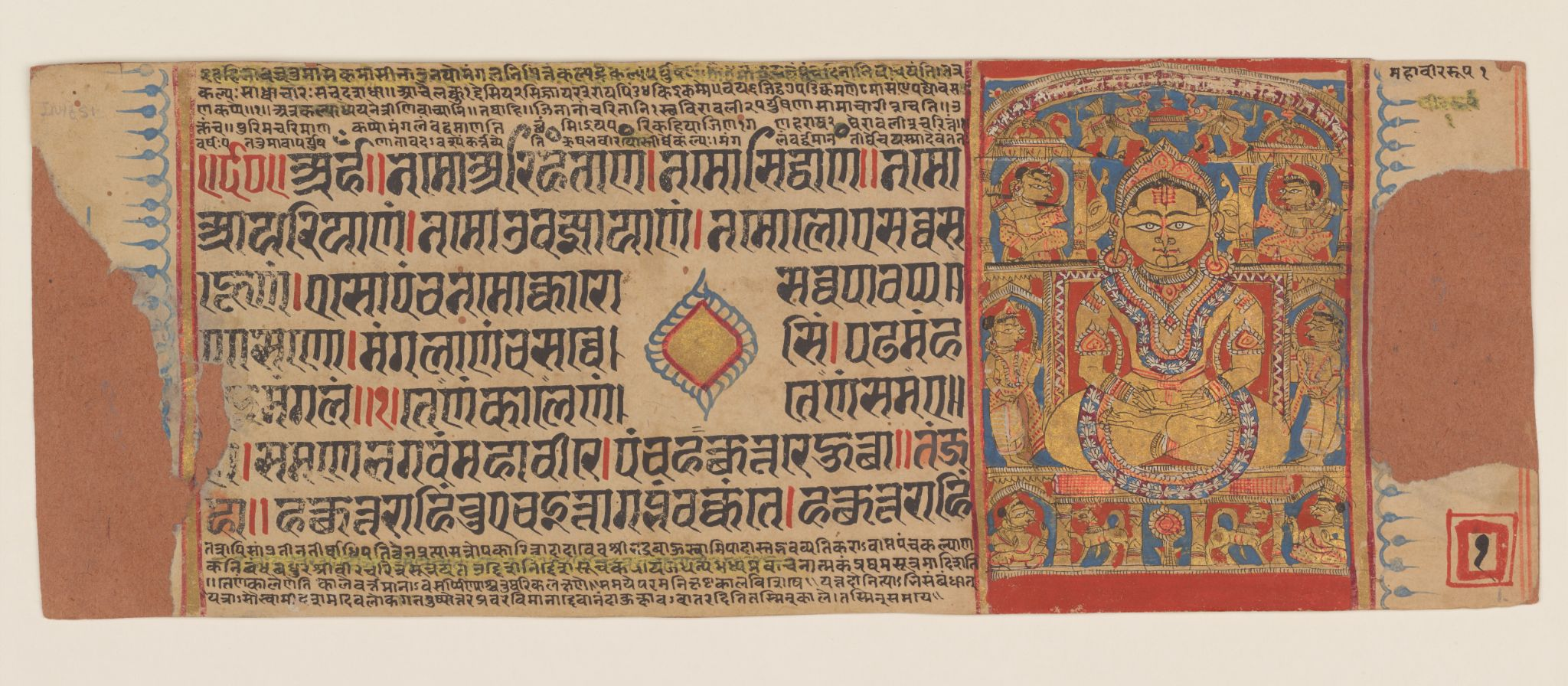
Manuscript of the Book of ritual (Kalpa-sūtra) and Story of the monk Kālaka (Kālakācārya-kathā). Gujarat, 1522

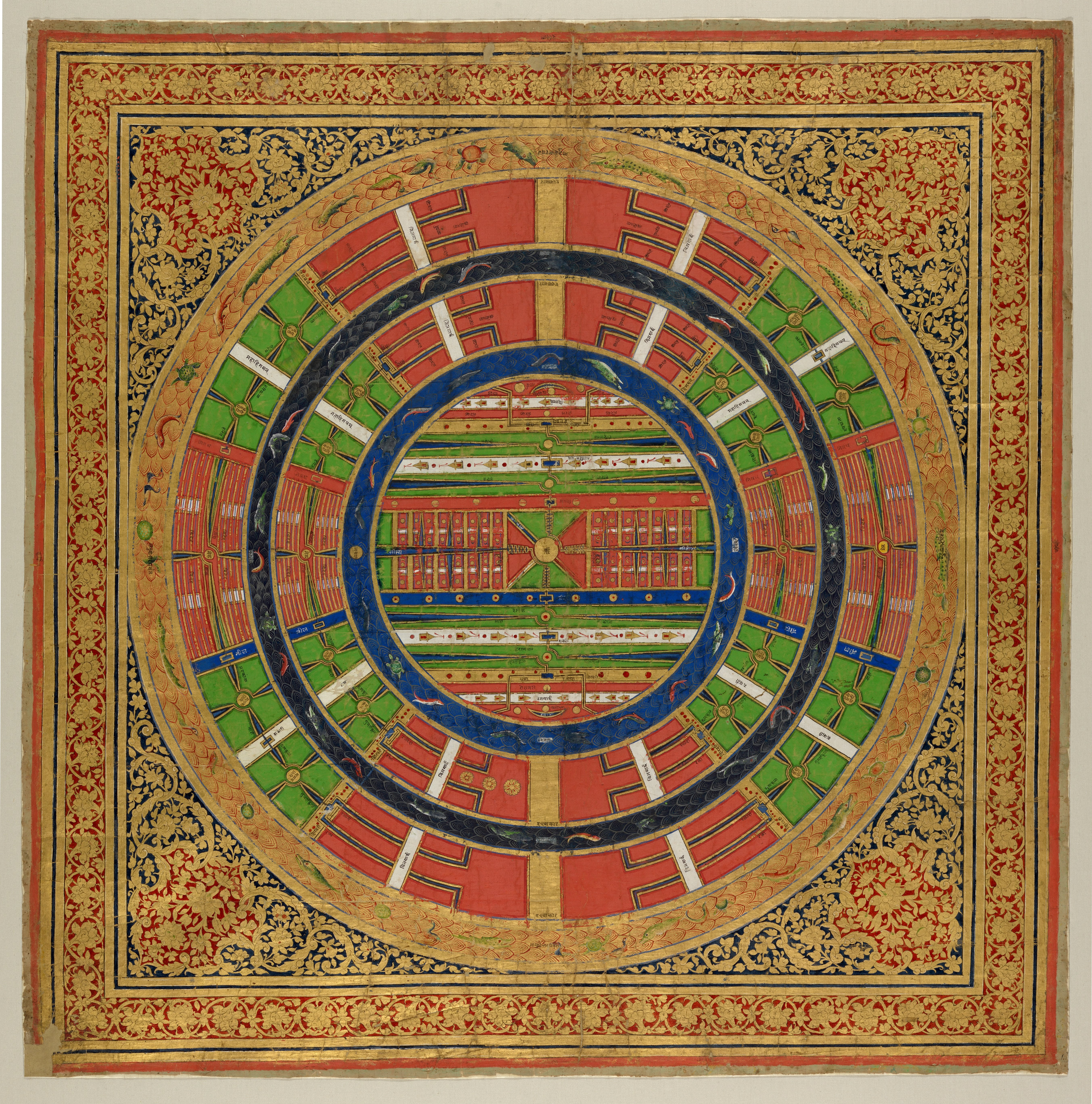
Two and a Half Continents. Jain cosmographical painting. Western India, late 18th - 19th century

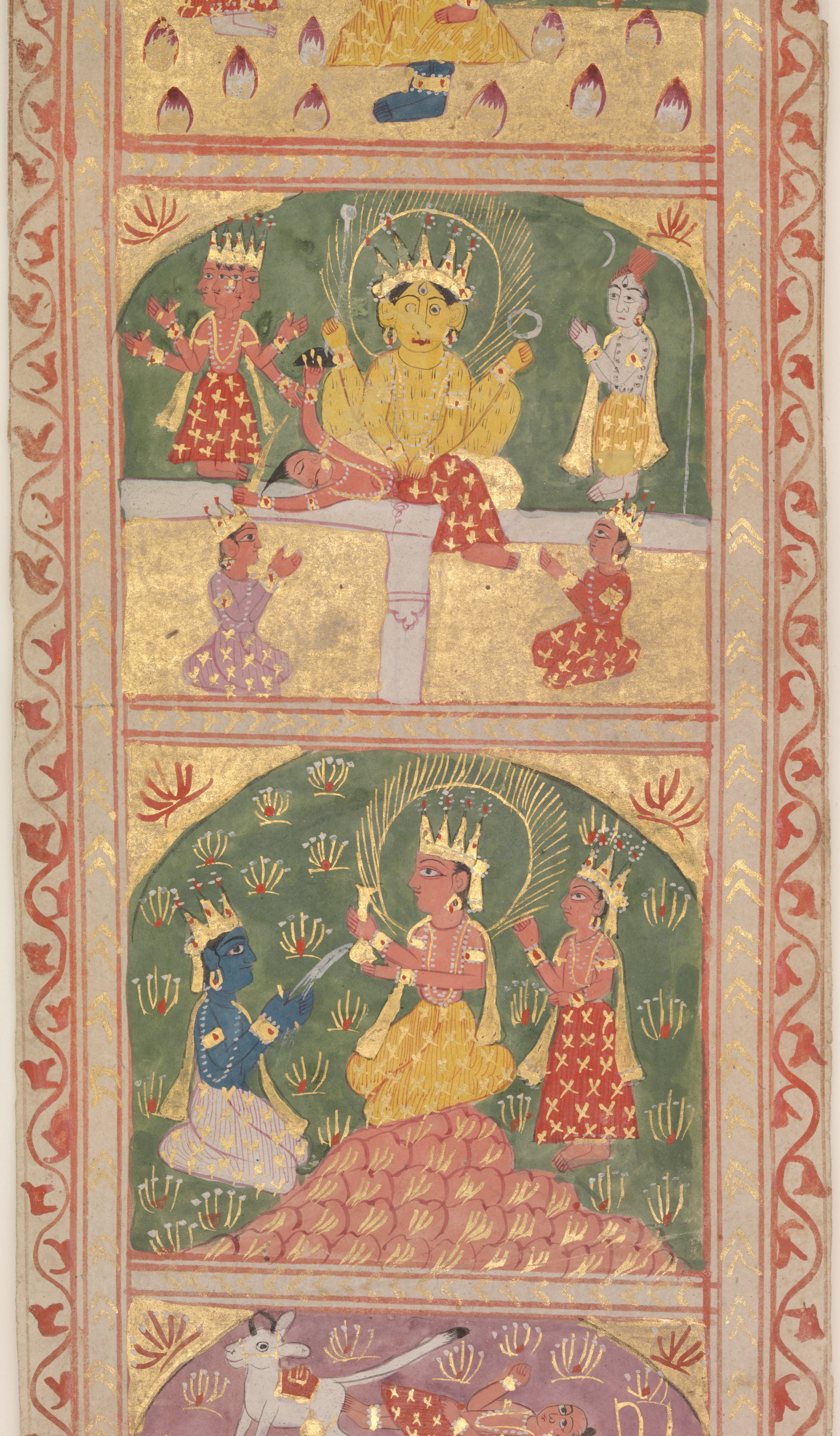
Bhagavata Purana. Northern India, late 18th or early 19th century

=== Islamic collection ===
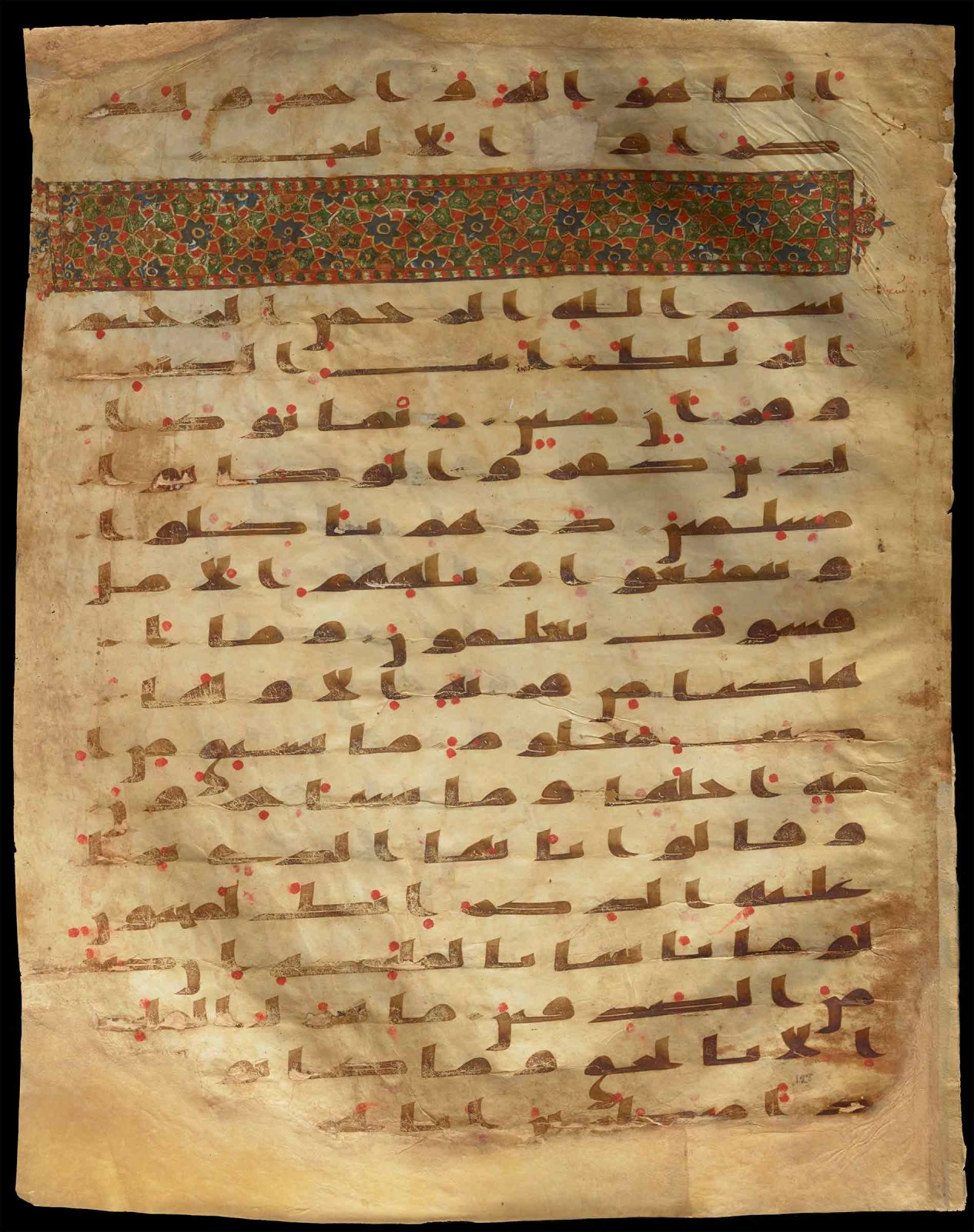
Parchment Qur'an manuscript. Possibly Syria or Yemen, c. 700-750

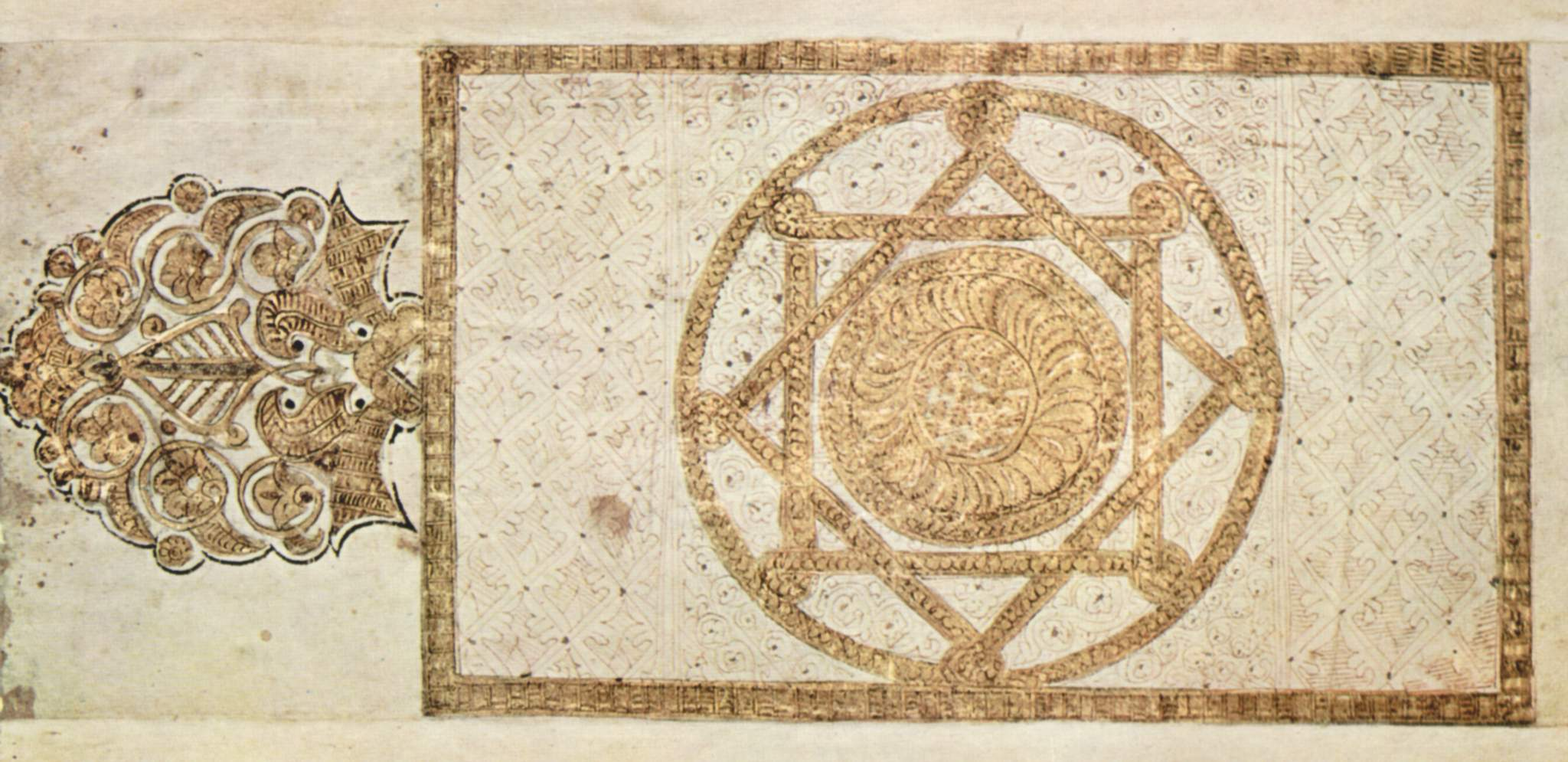
Folio from the parchment Qur'an manuscript. Syria, c. 900

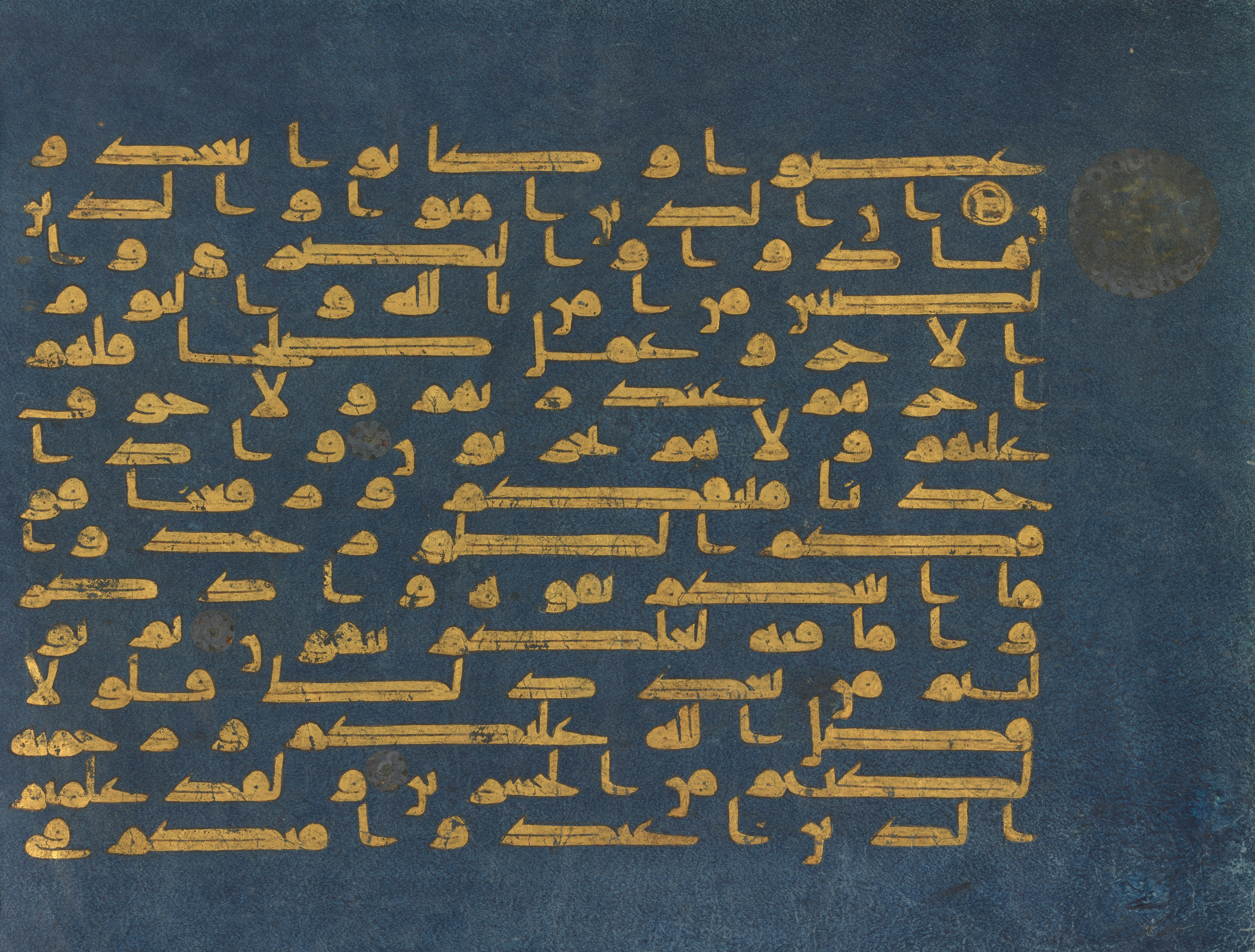
Two folios from the Blue Quran

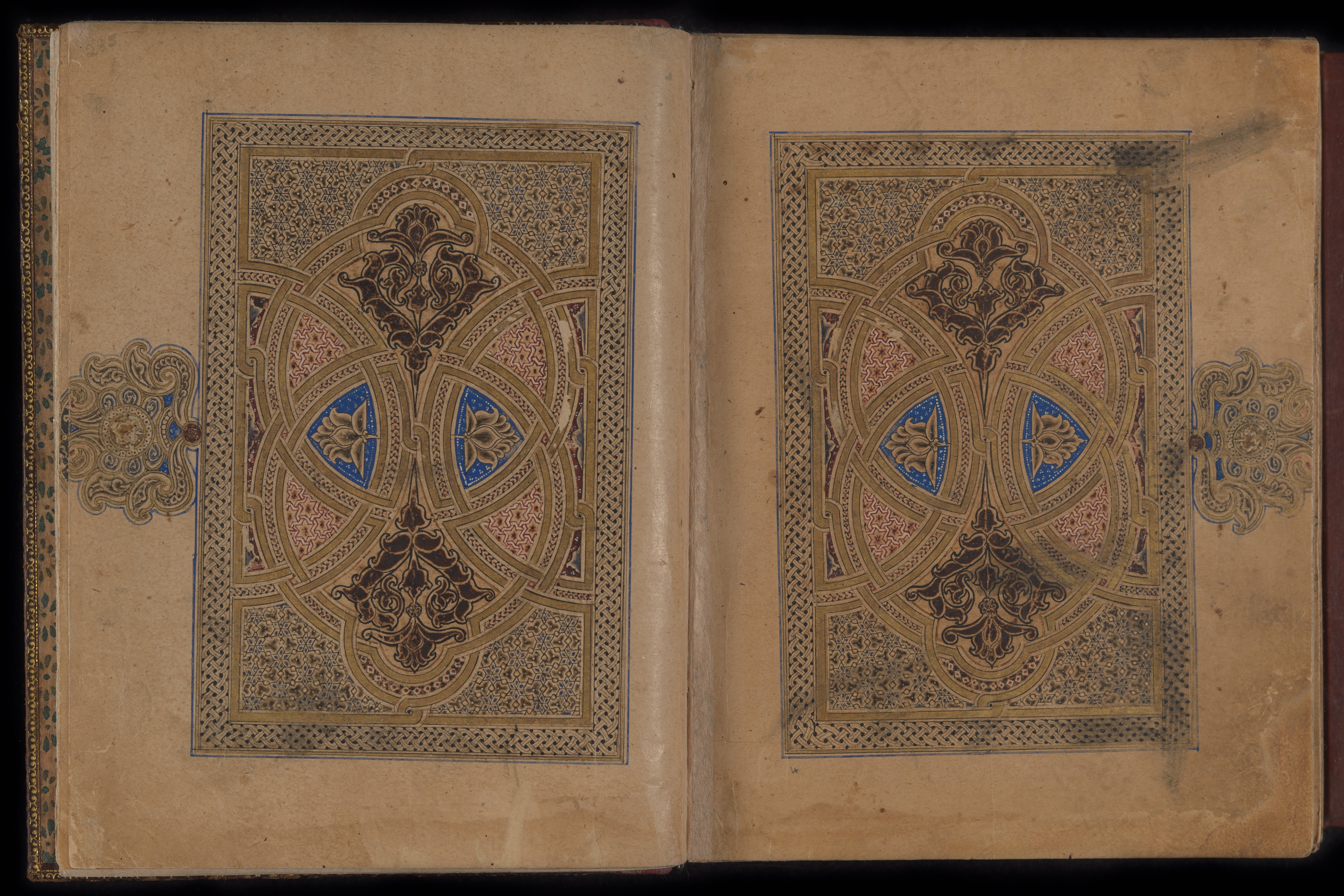
The Ibn al-Bawwab Qur'an. Baghdad, 1000/1001

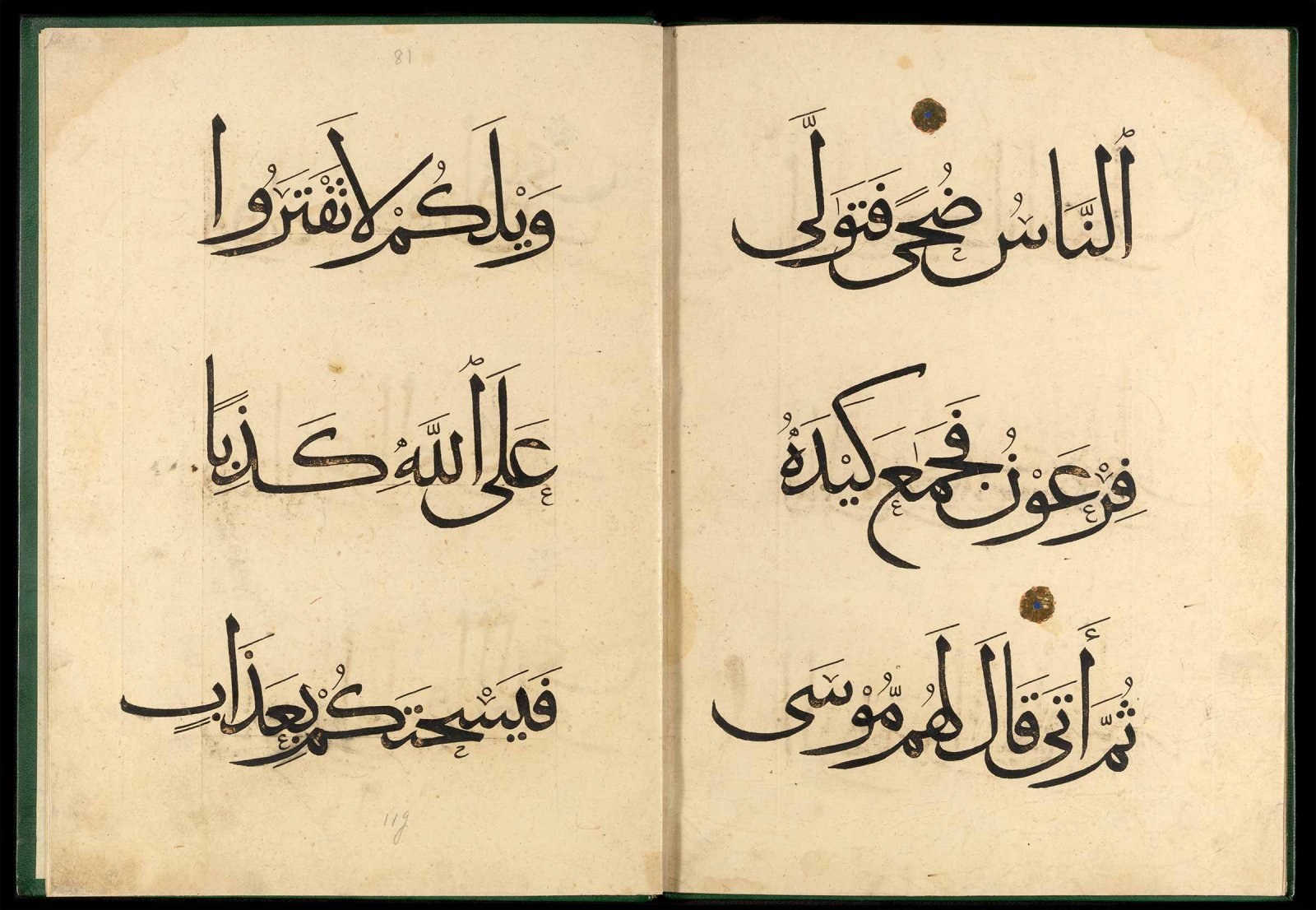
Qur'an copied by Muhammad ibn al-Wahid. Cairo, c. 1306-1310

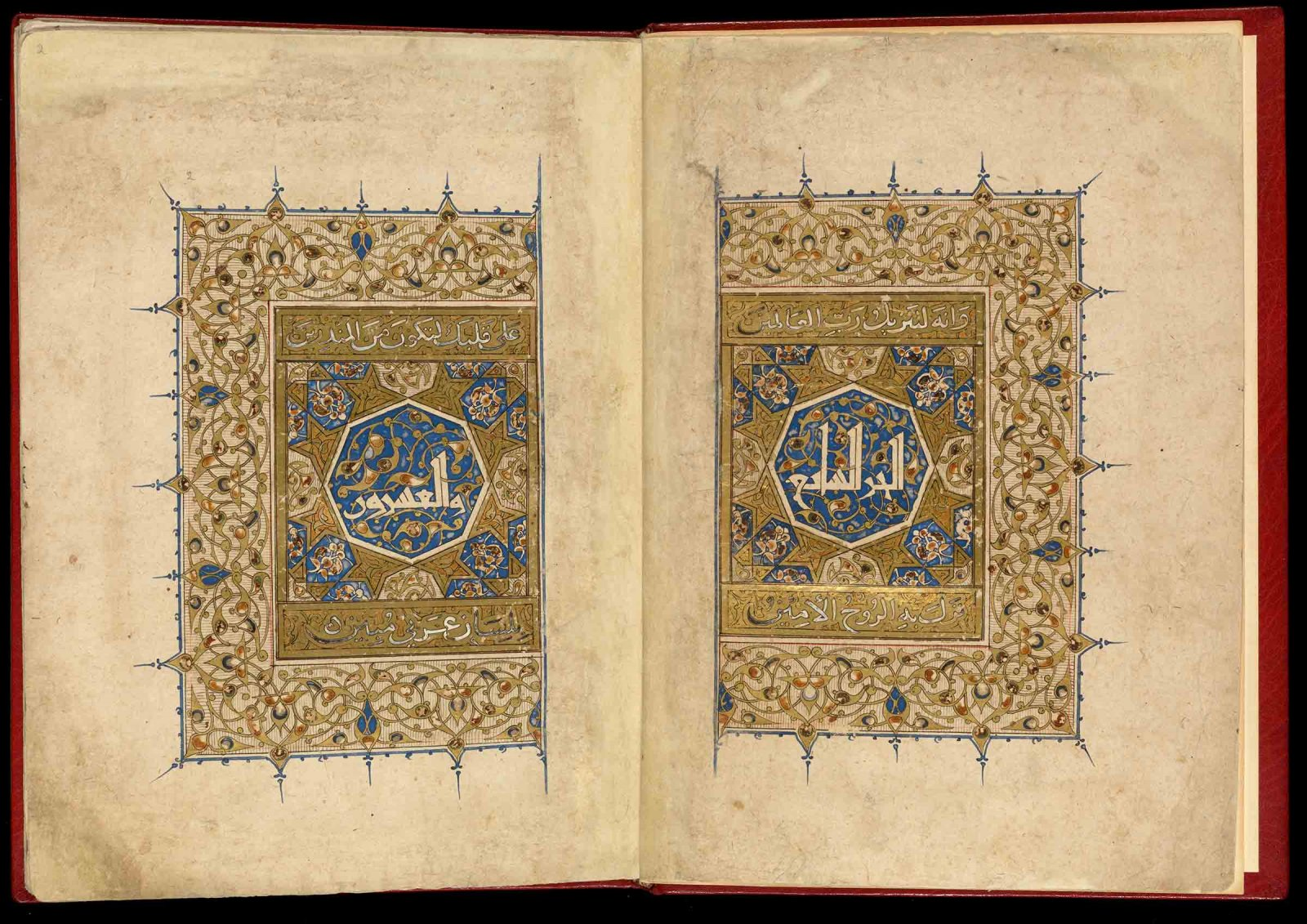
Juz' 27 of the Qur'an copied and illuminated by Ahmad ibn Kamal al-Mutatabbib. Cairo, 1332-1336

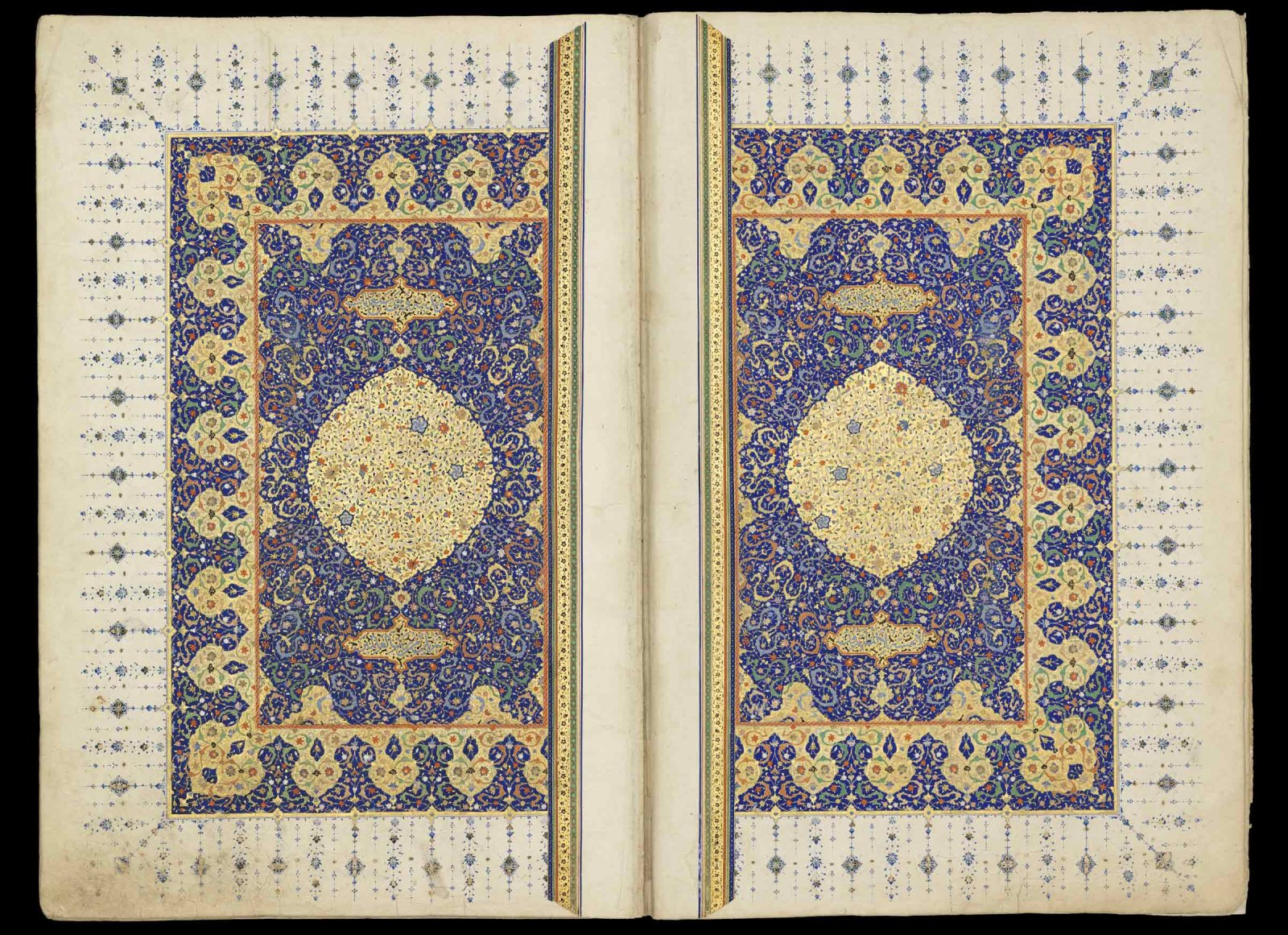
Ruzbihan Qur'an. Shiraz, c. 1550

=== Japanese collection ===
Jizō Bosatsu. Hanging scroll, 15th century

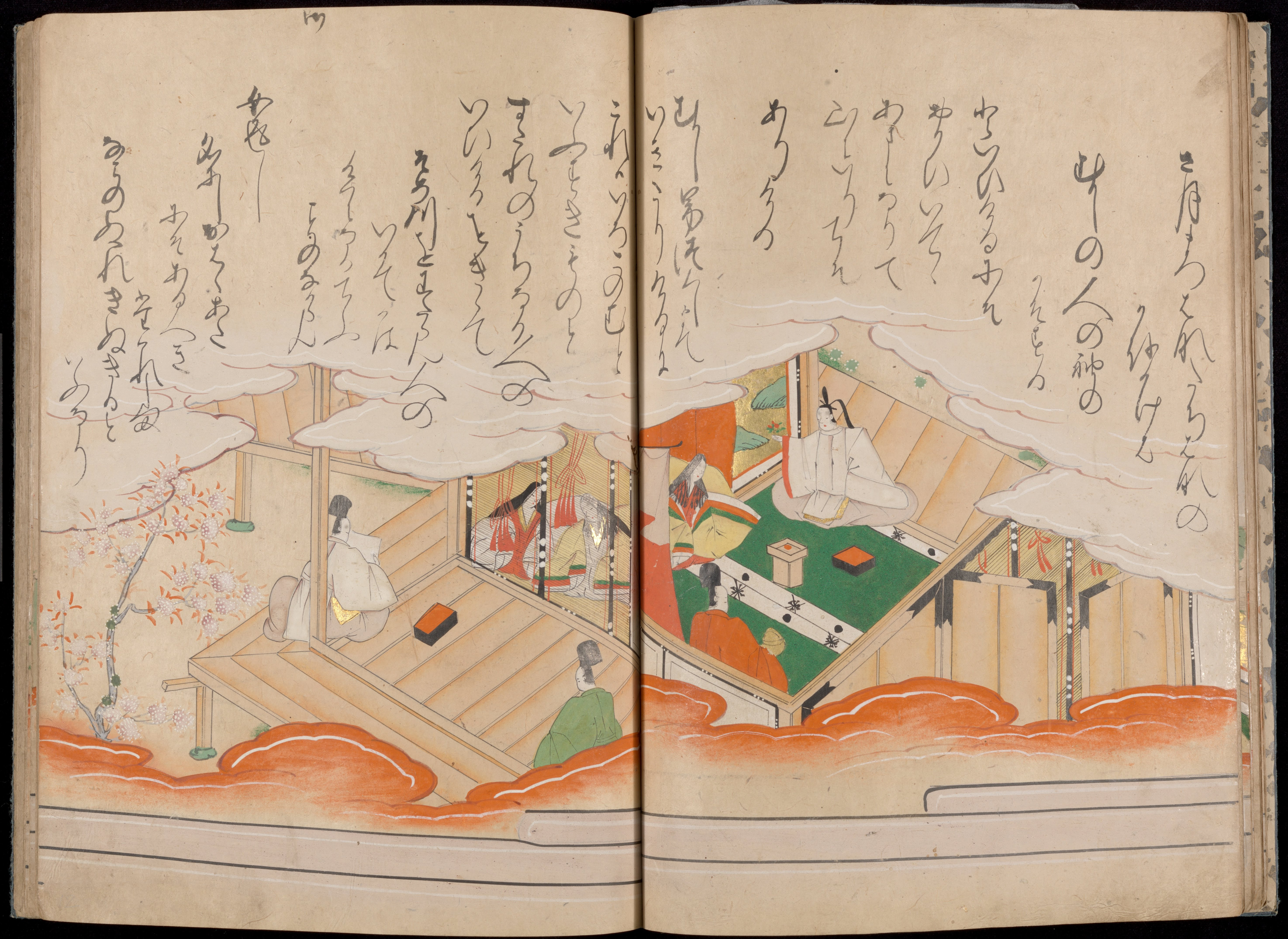
The Tales of Ise (Ise monogatari). Manuscript from the late 16th century

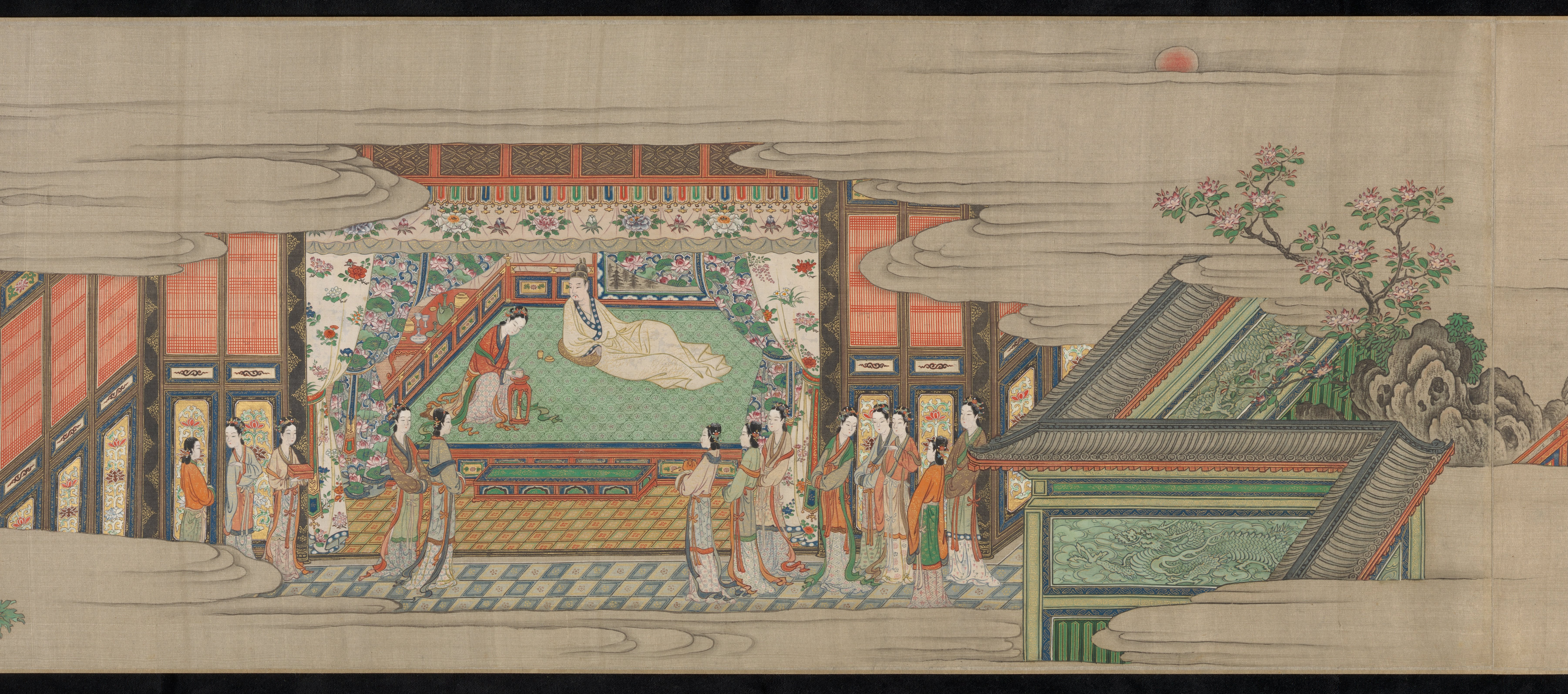
Pair of handscroll paintings with scenes from Nagauta Song by Kanō Sansetsu, c. 1640s

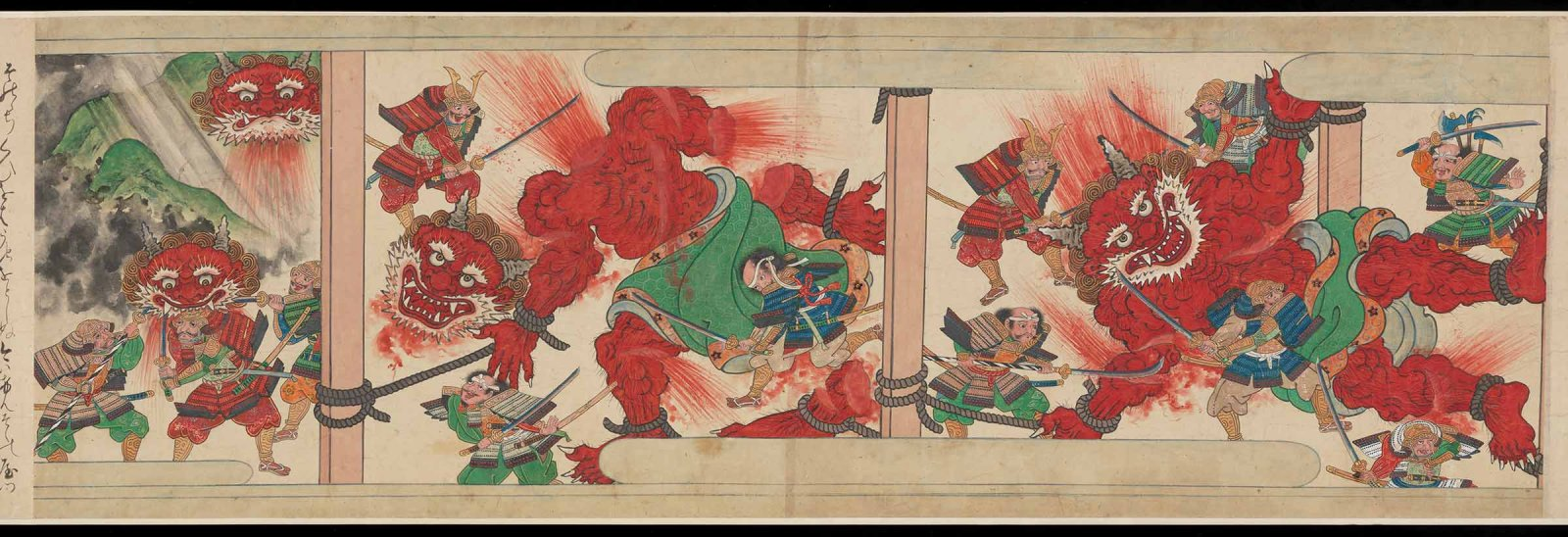
17th century manuscript of the Ōeyama Emaki.

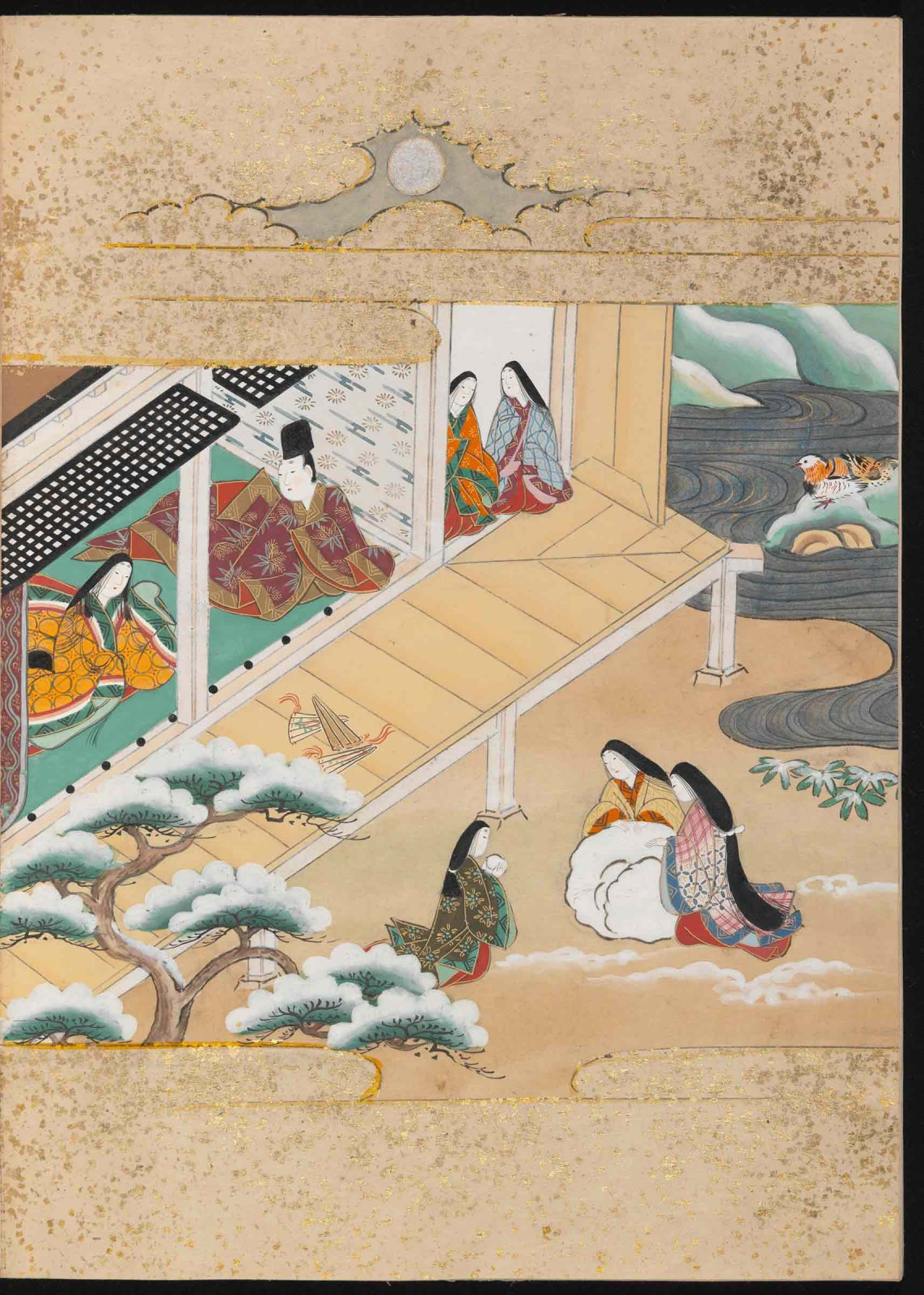
17th century manuscript of The Tale of Genji

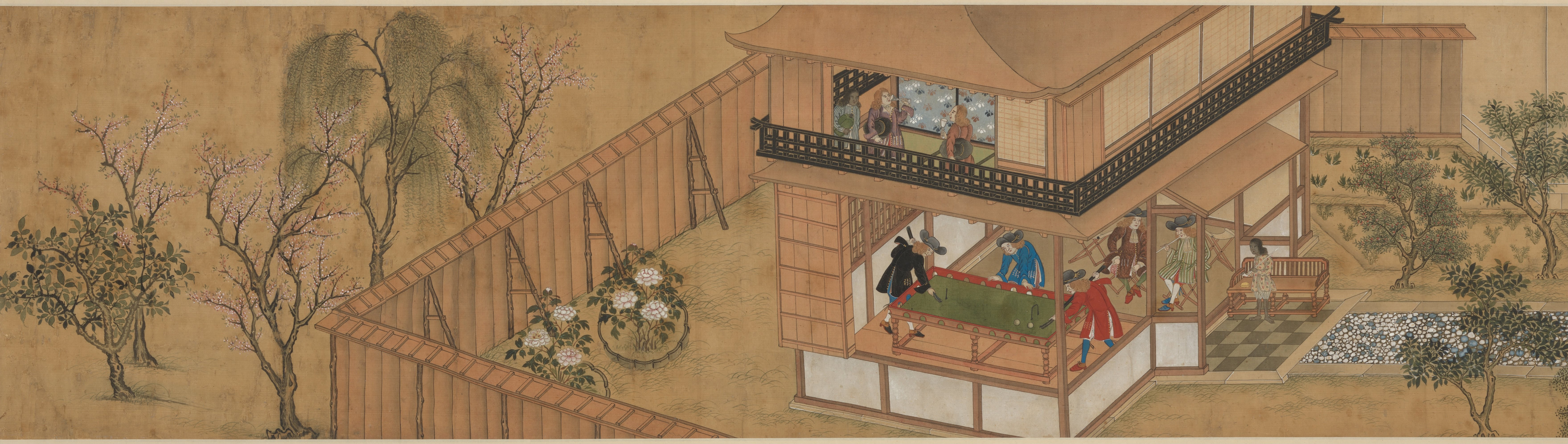
Dutch mansions in Dejima, Nagasaki (Nagasaki Dejima Rankan no zu). Handscroll from the 18th century

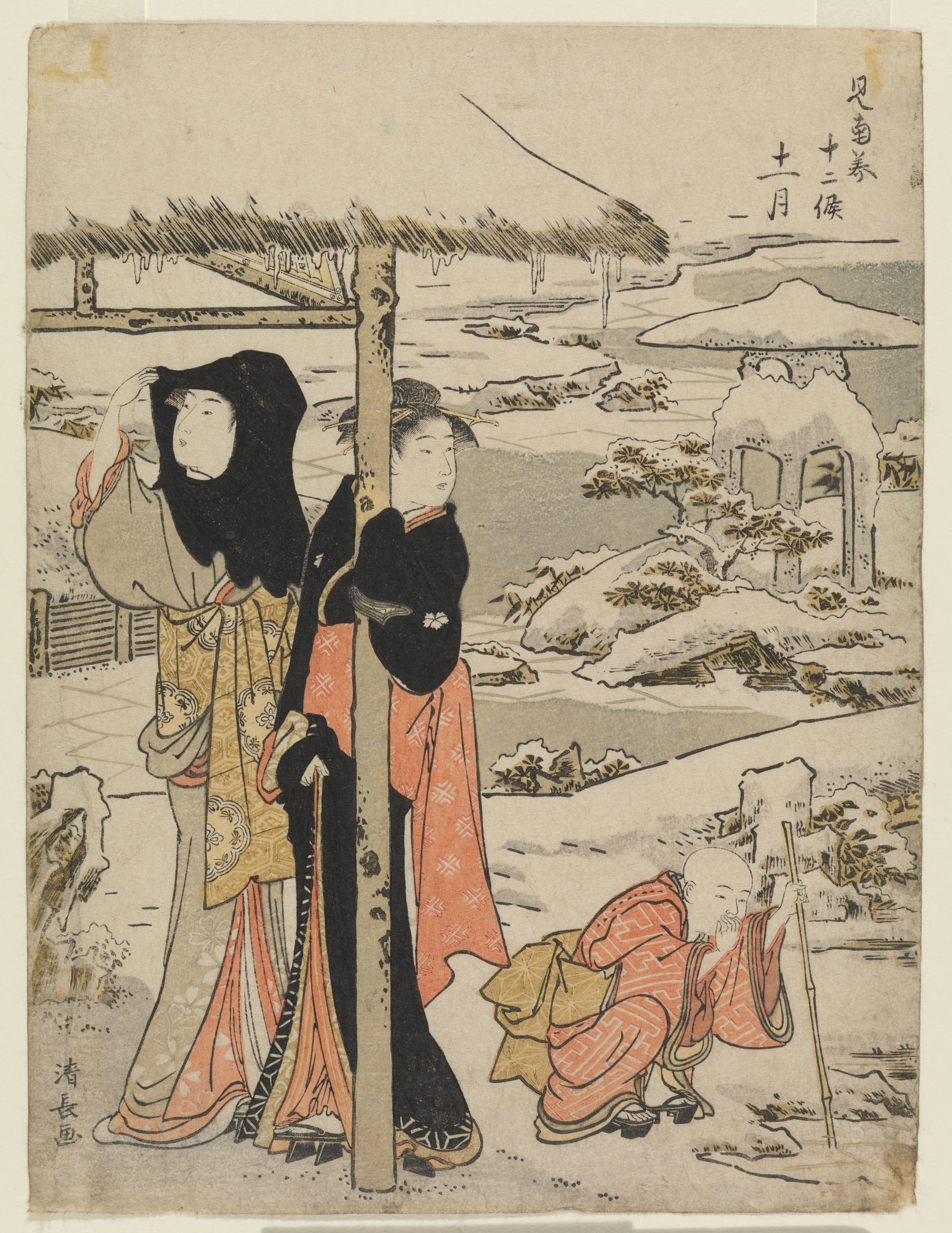
Eleventh month (Jūichi gatsu). Woodblock print from the series Twelve months of the southern quarter (Minami jūni ko) by Torii Kiyonaga, c. 1783

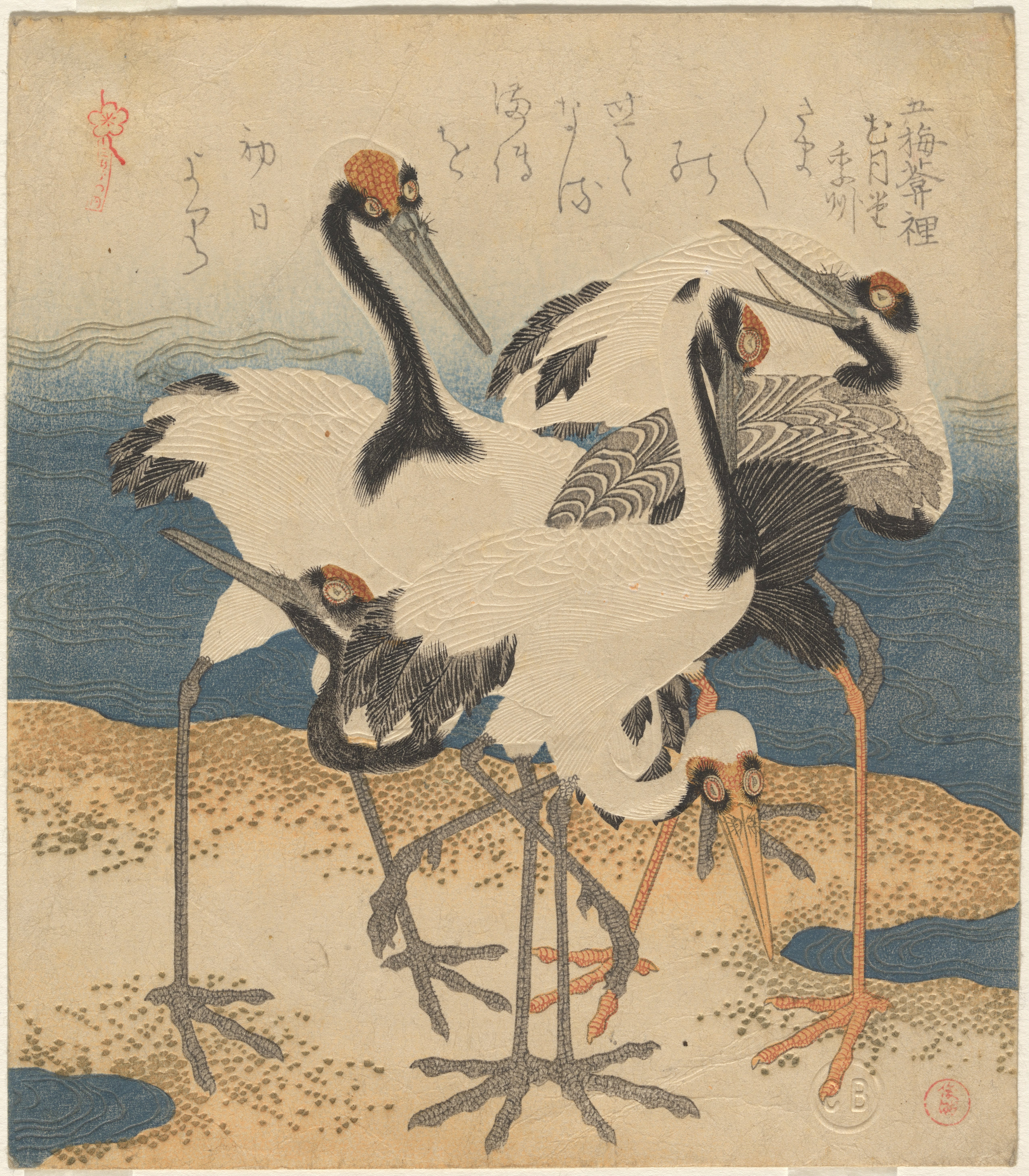
Five cranes on a spit of sand. Surimono by Kubo Shunman, probably 1816

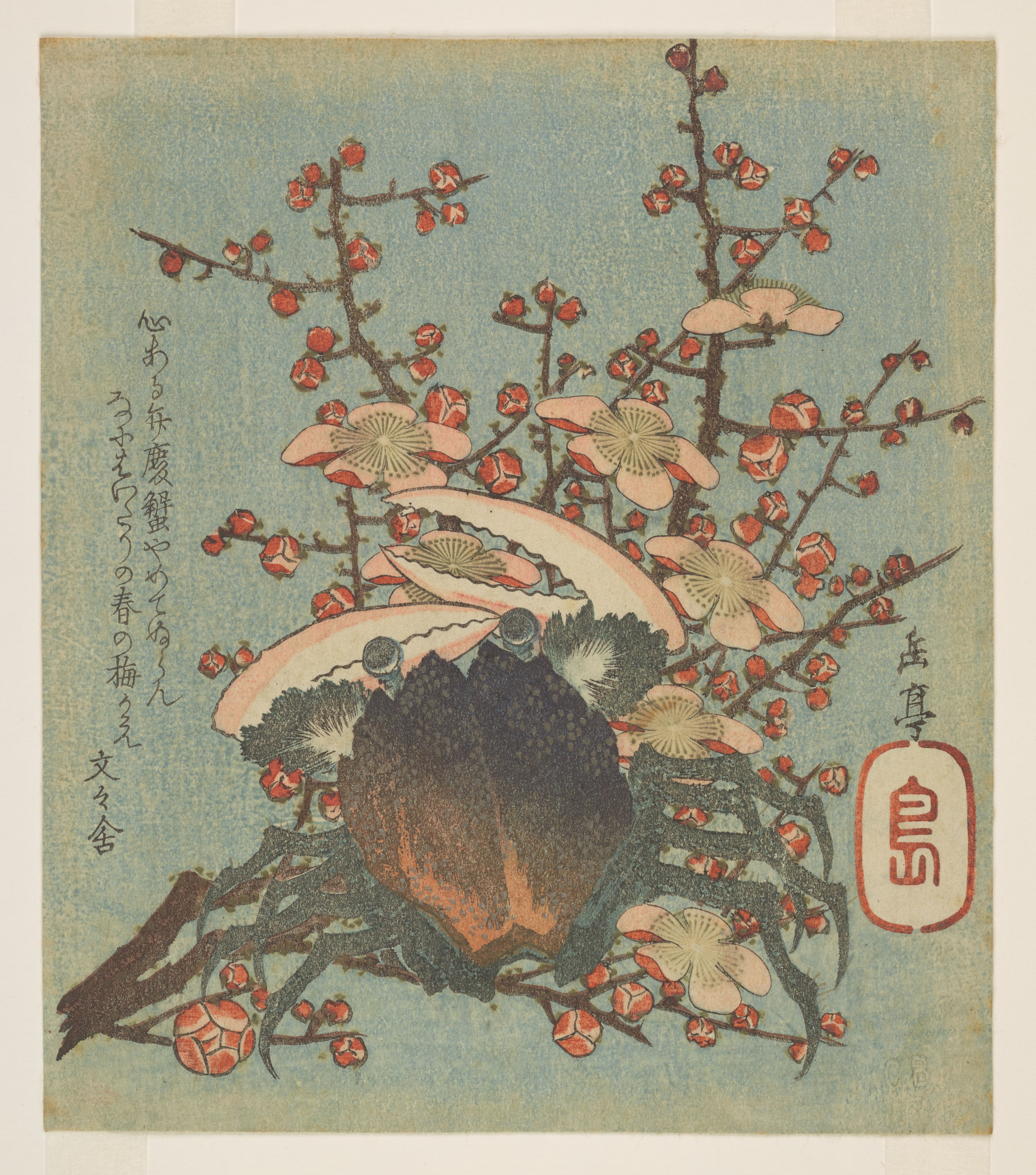
Benkei crab and plum blossom. Surimono by Yashima Gakutei with poems signed Bunbunsha, c.1823

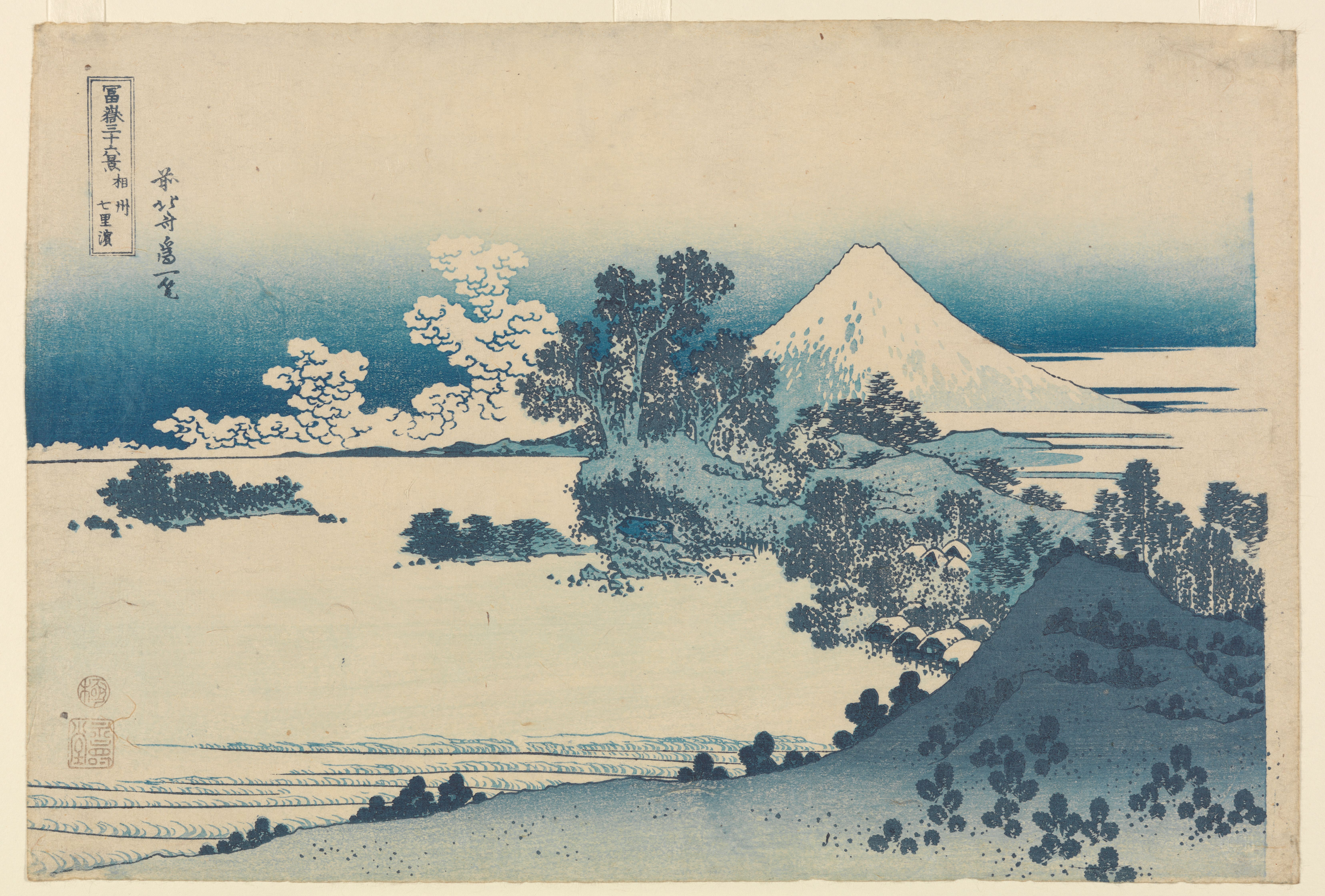
Seven-mile beach in Sagami province (Sōshū Shichiri-ga-hama). Woodblock print from the series Thirty-six Views of Mount Fuji (Fugaku sanjūrokkei) by Katsushika Hokusai, c. 1831

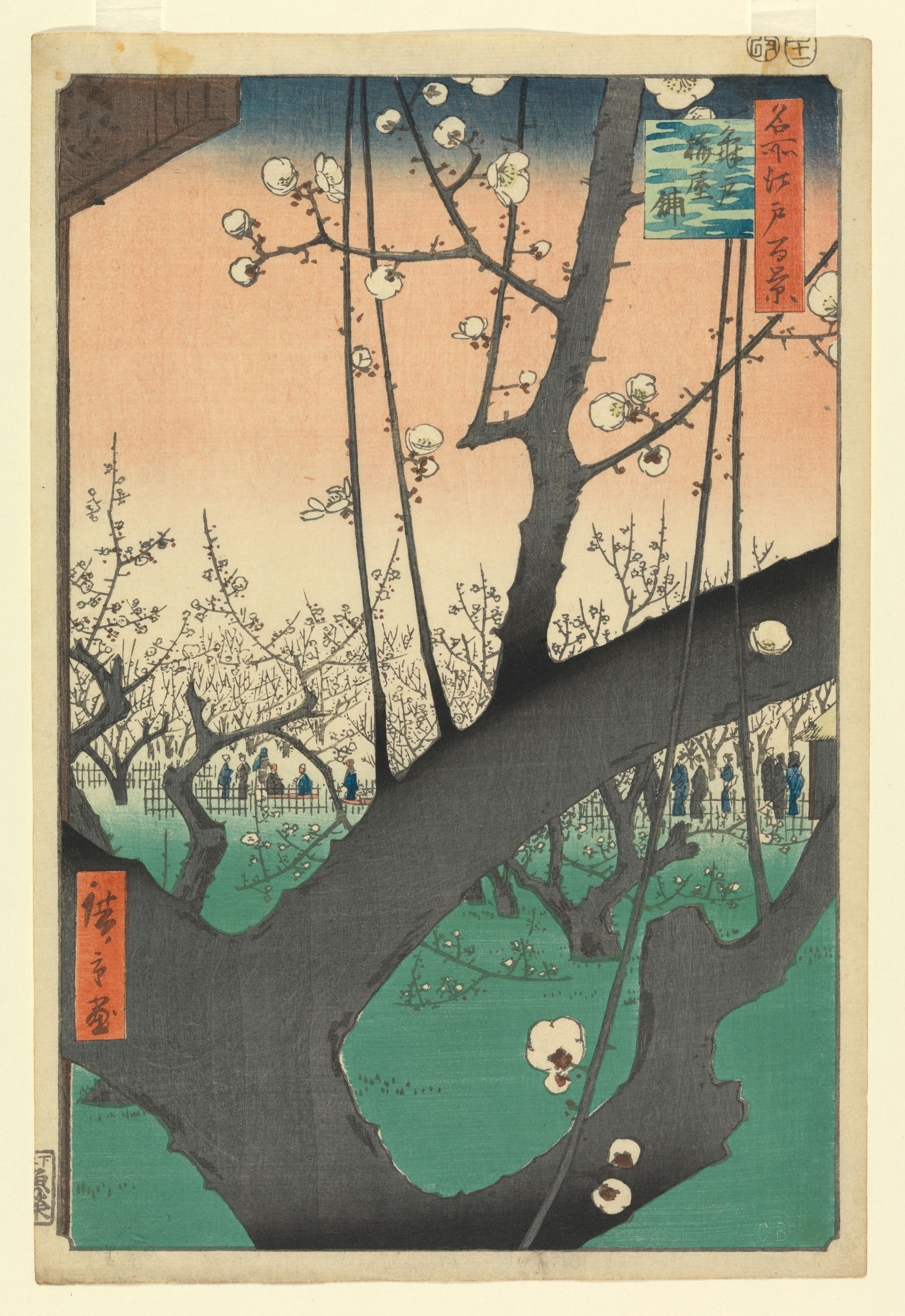
Plum Park in Kameido, woodblock print from the series One Hundred Famous Views of Edo (Meisho Edo hyakkei) by Utagawa Hiroshige, 1857

=== Papyrus collection ===
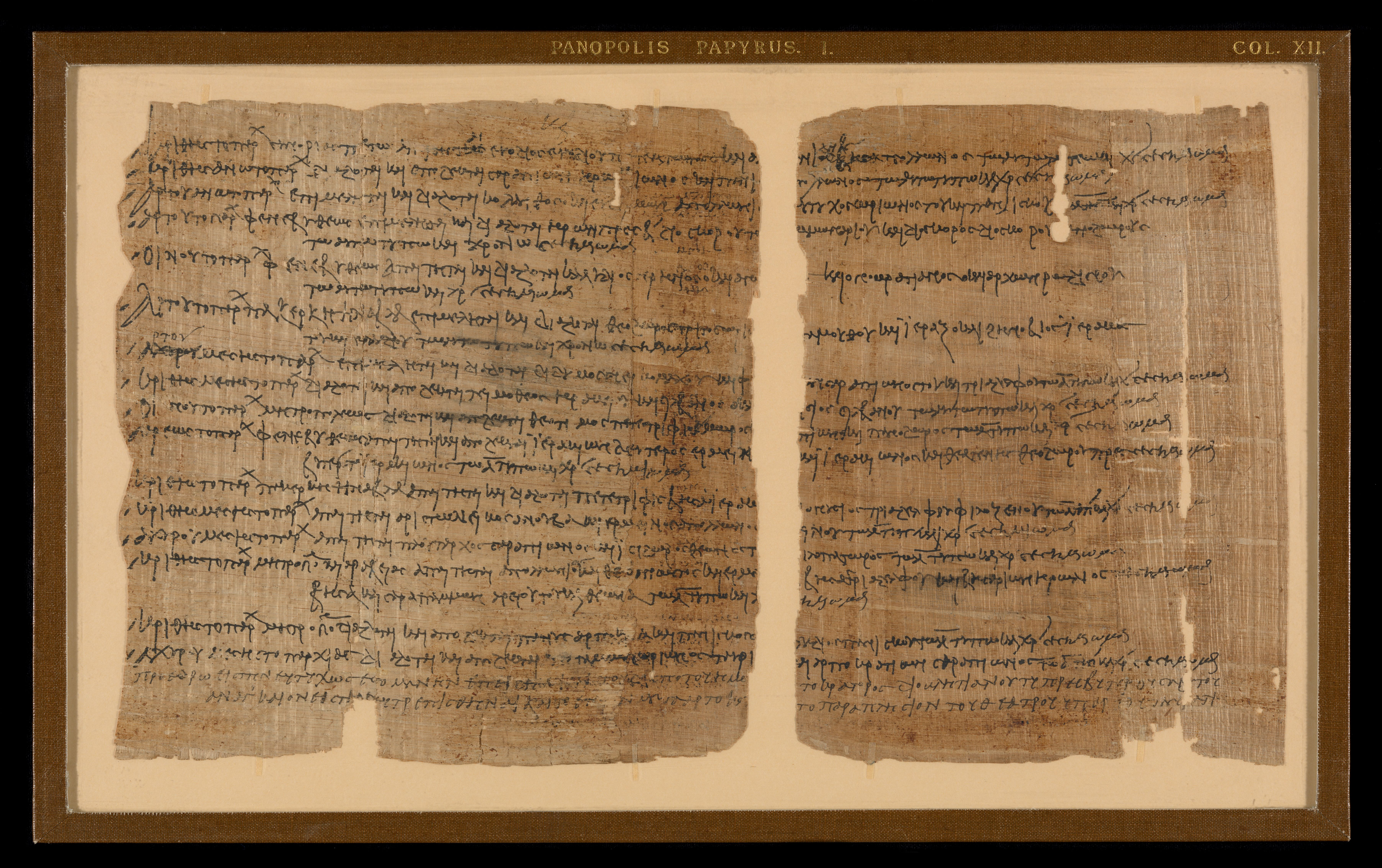
Official correspondence of the Strategos of Panopolis concerning the preparations for the forthcoming visit of Diocletian. Panopolis, 298

=== Persian collection ===
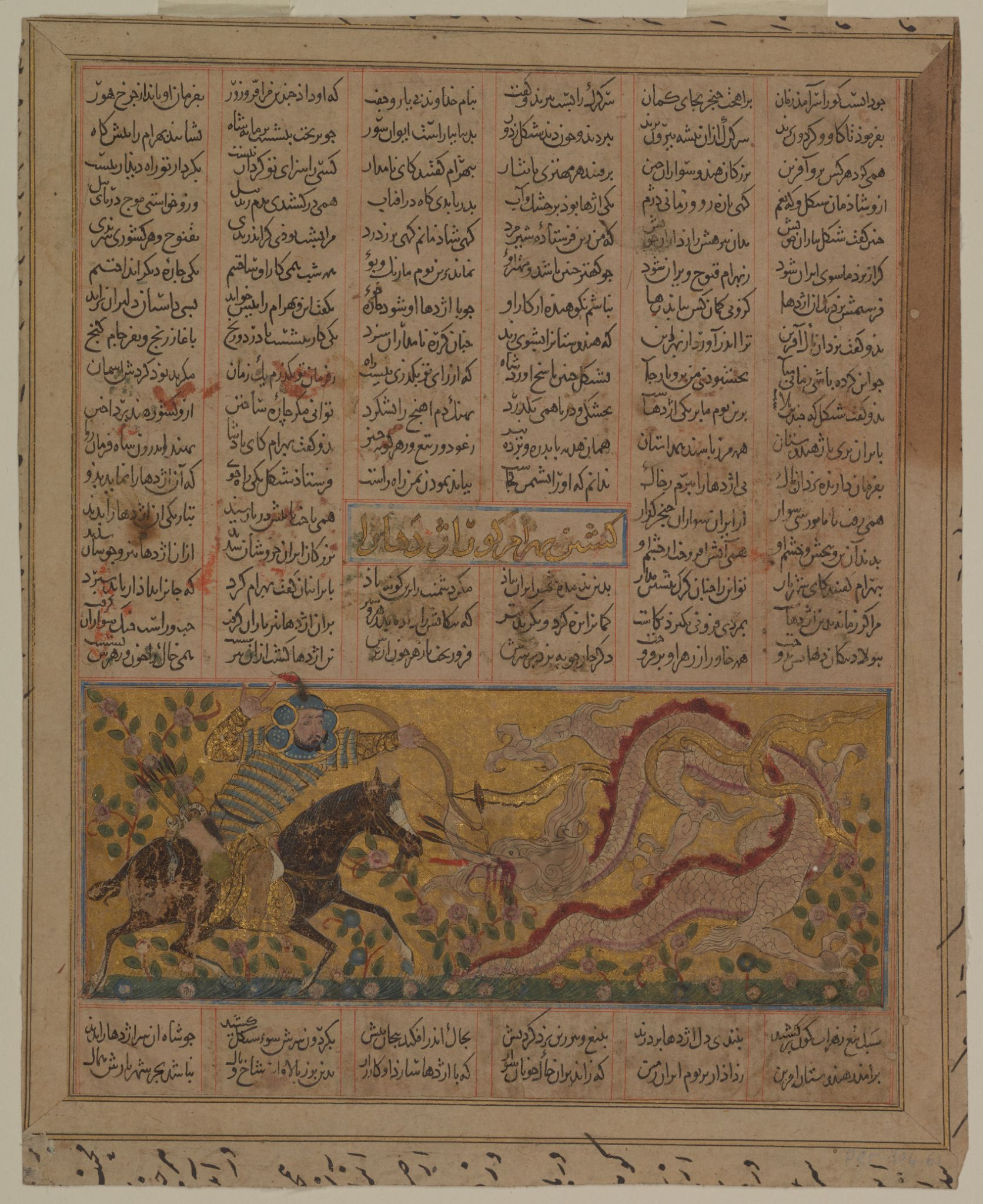
Bahram Gur kills a dragon in India. From the "First Small Shahnama". Possibly Tabriz, c. 1300

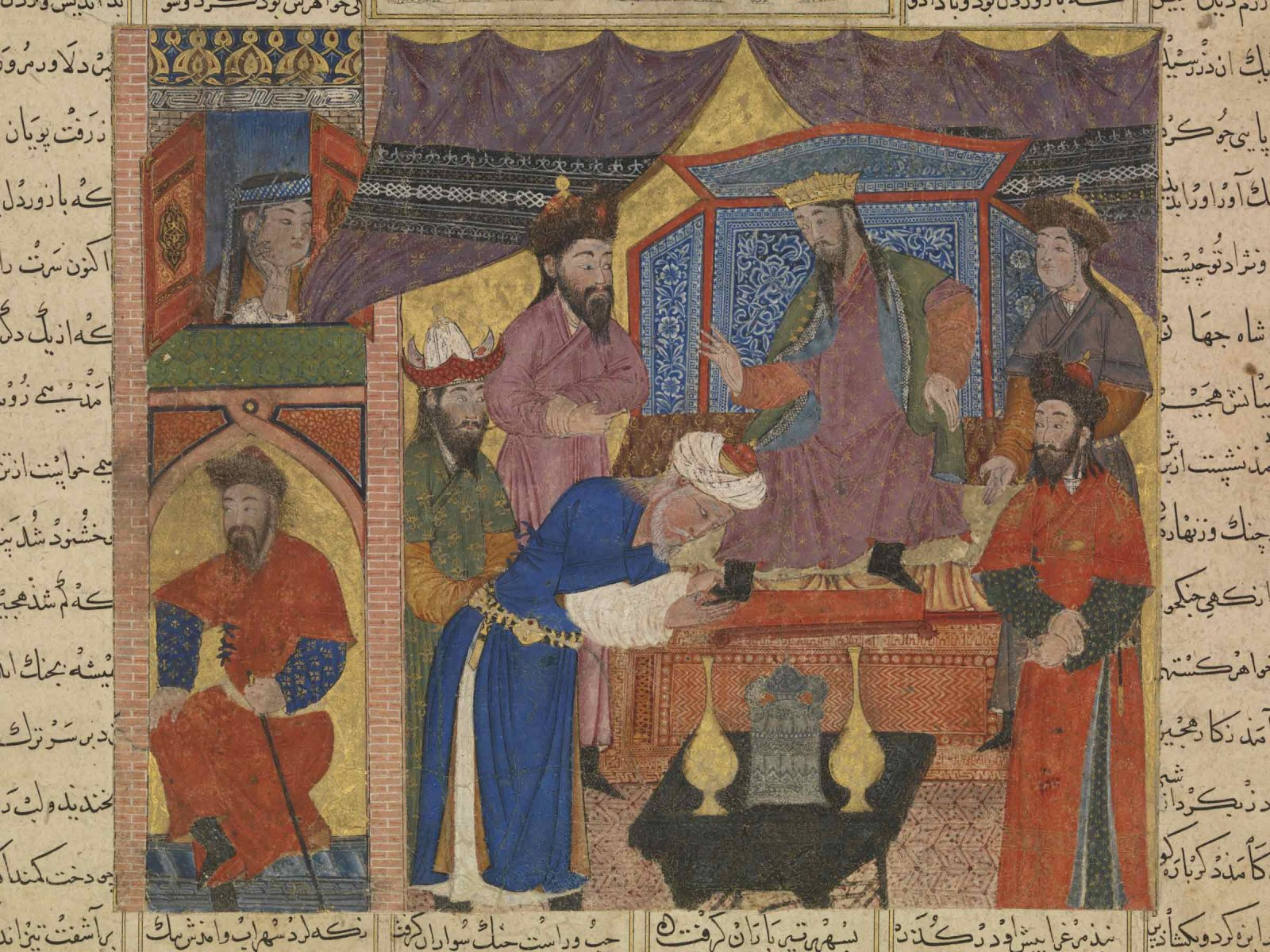
Zal meets king Manuchihr, asking for his mercy. From the "Great Mongol Shahnameh". Tabriz, c. 1330

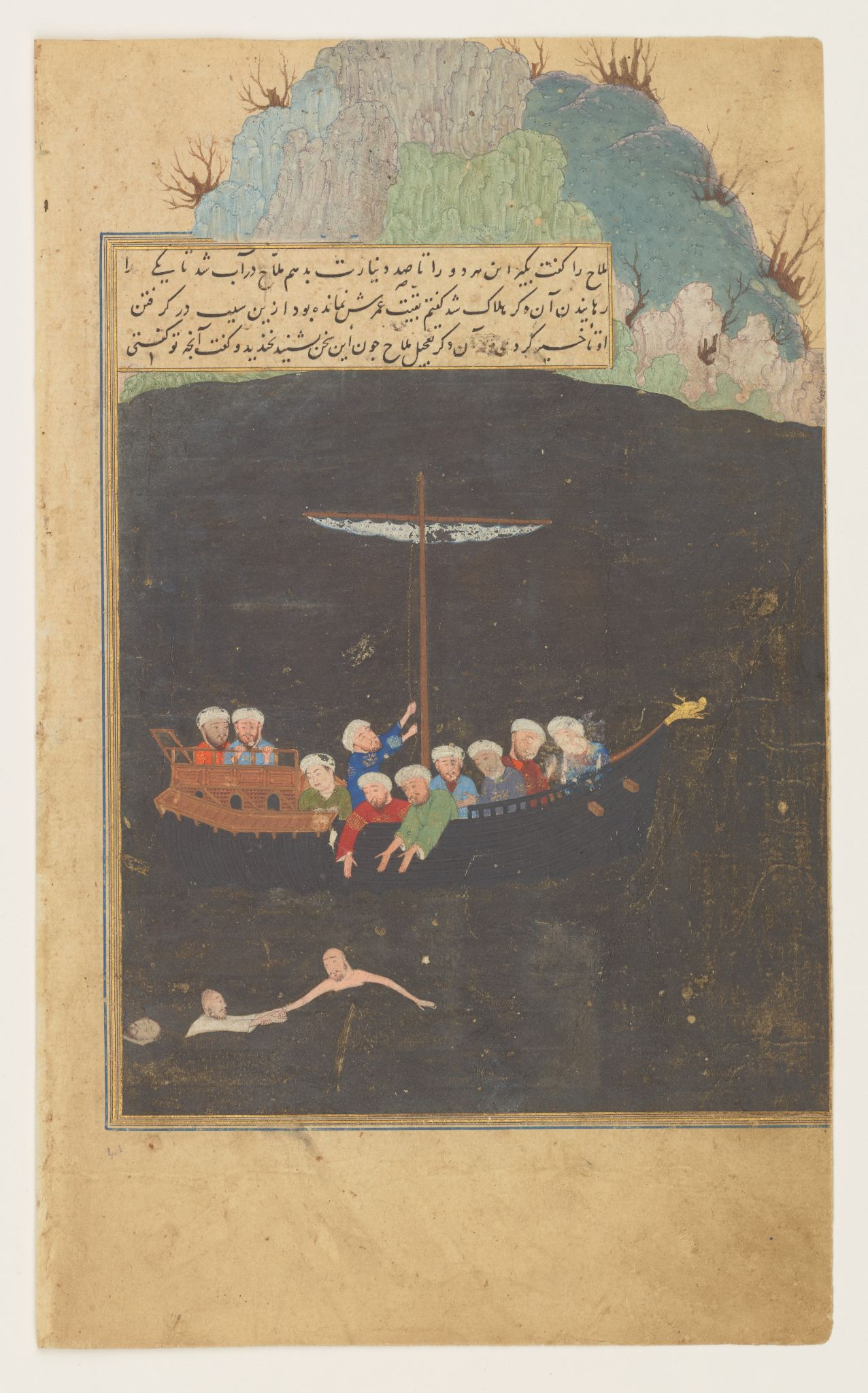
The rescue at sea by Amir Khalil. From Prince Baysunghur's Rose Garden (Gulistan). Herat, 1427

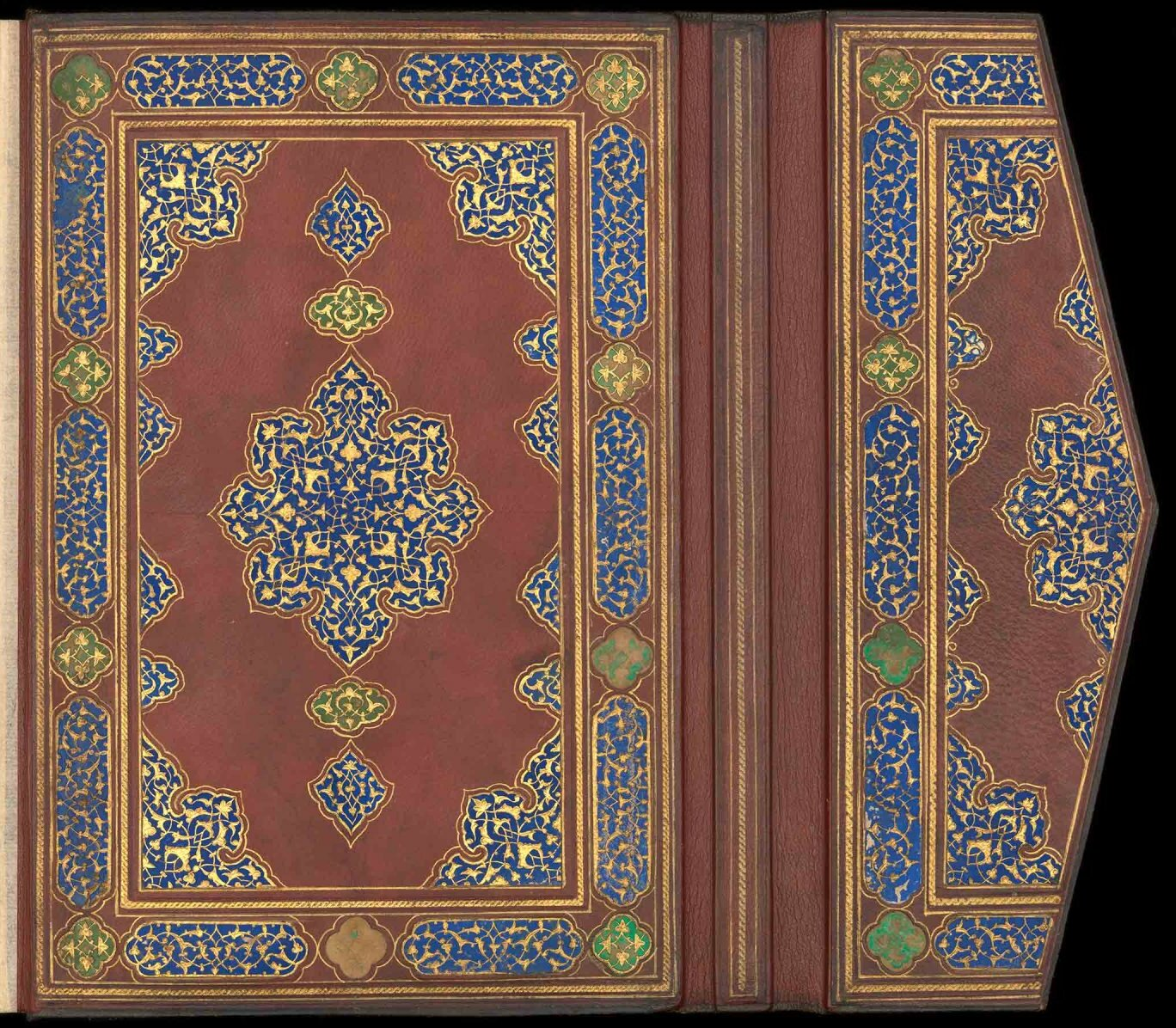
Filigree leather book cover, for the Five Poems (Khamsa) of Amir Khusrau. Herat, 1485

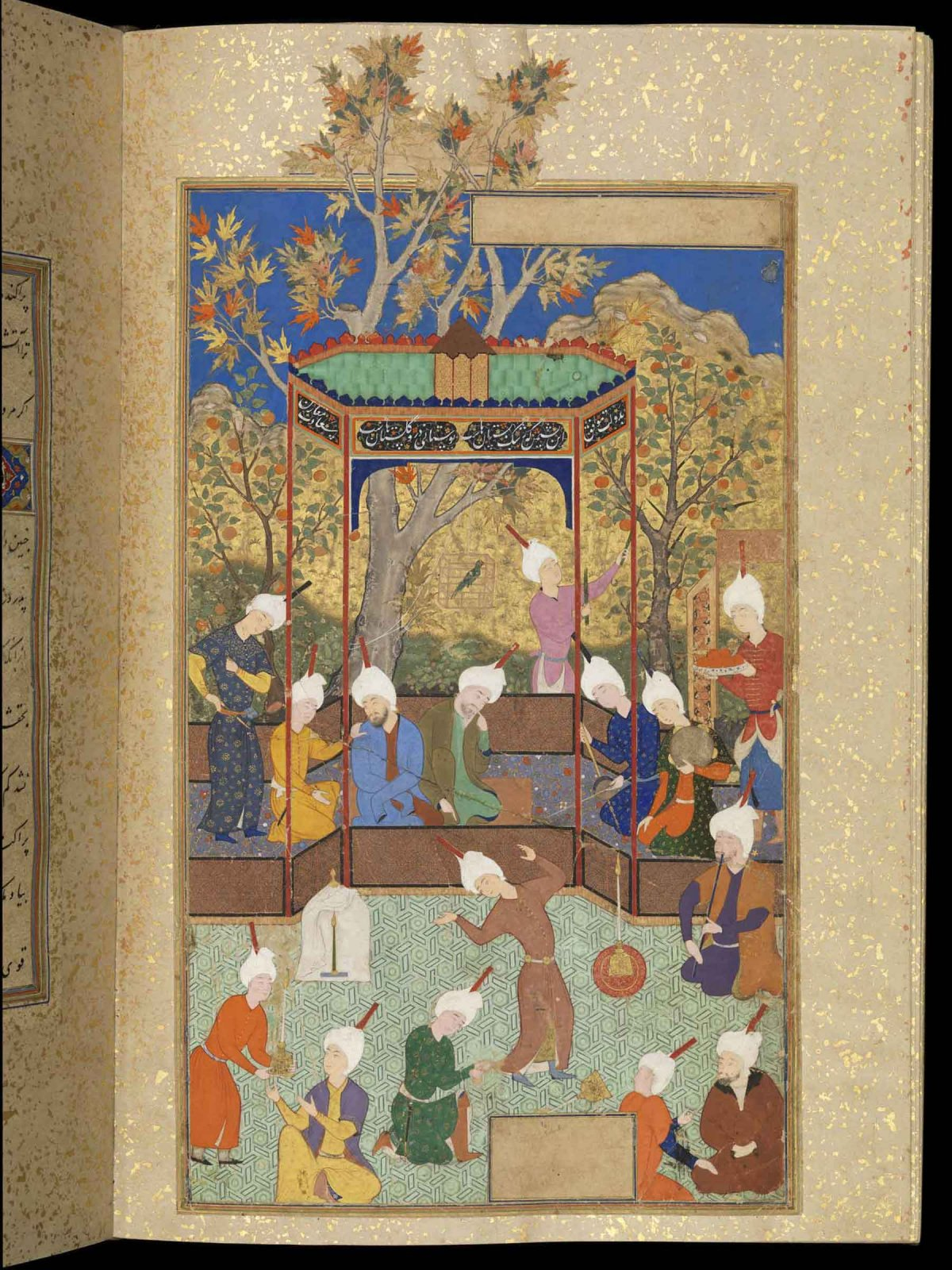
A party at night. Safavid miniature (possibly by Mirza Ali) attached to the Timurid copy of Bustan. Tabriz, c. 1540.

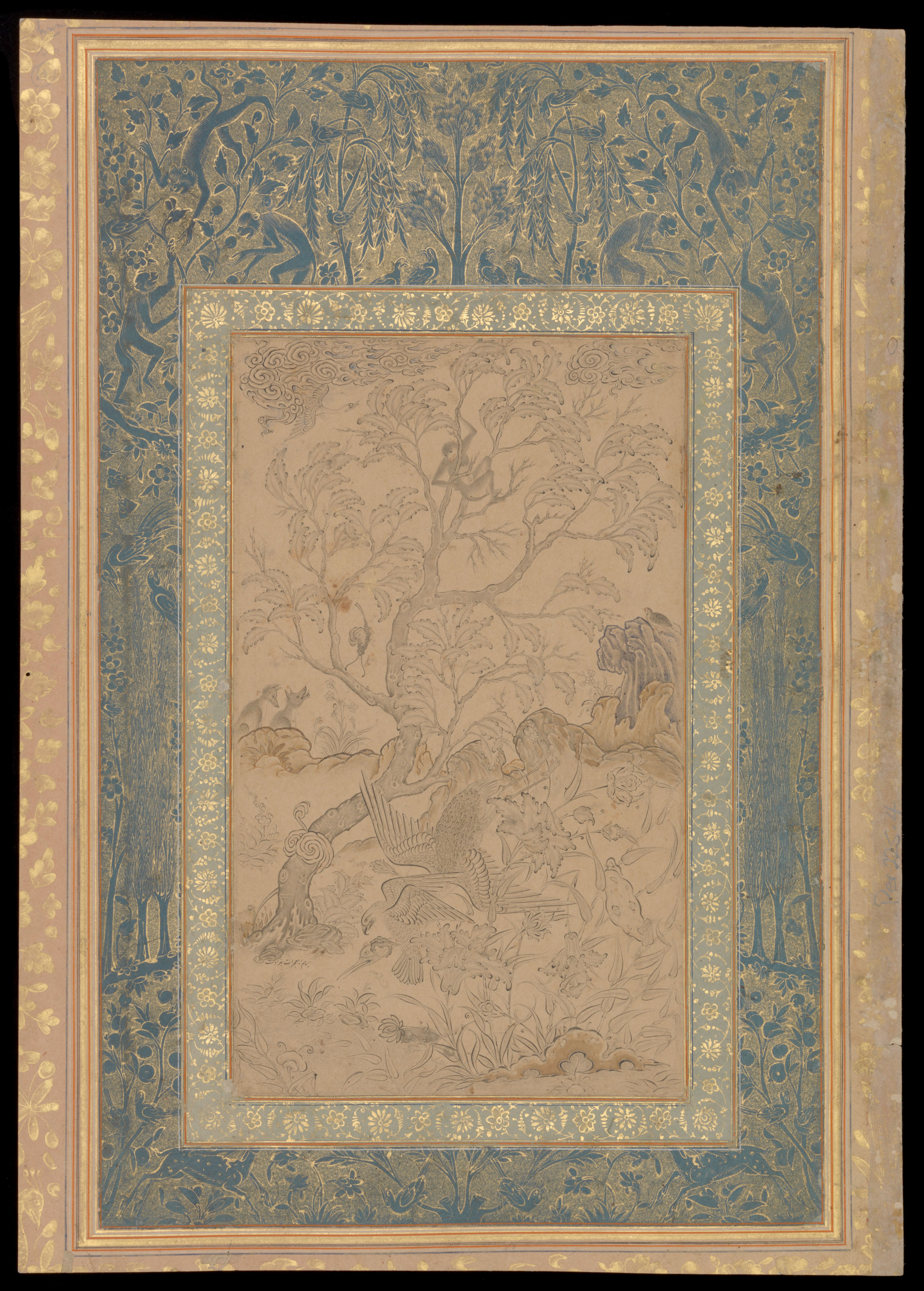
Tinted drawing of a hawk attacking a heron in landscape. From an muraqqa for Muhammad Quli Qutb Shah. Possibly Iran, c. 1550-1600

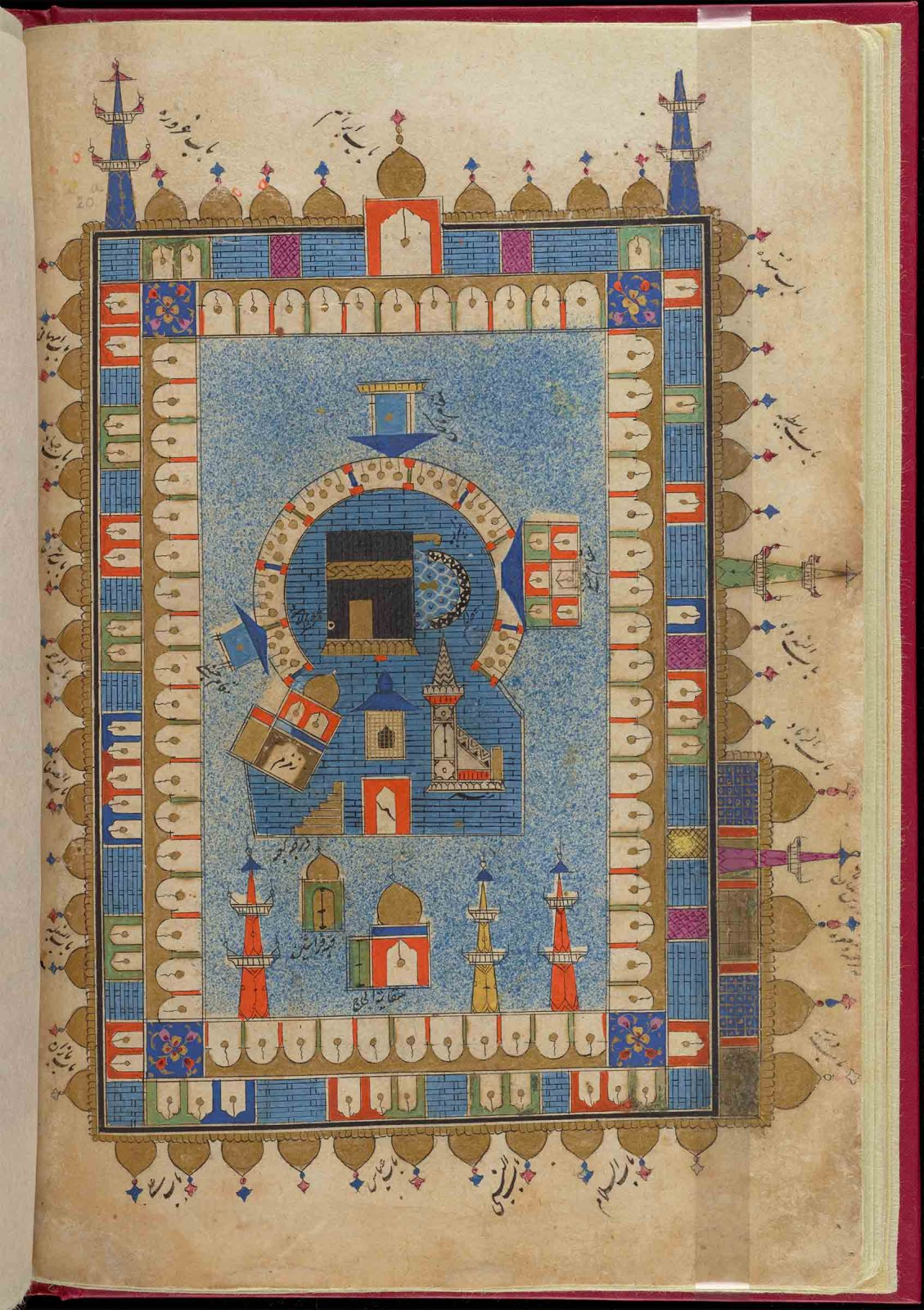
Manuscript of the Futuh al-Haramayn. Mecca, late 16th-century

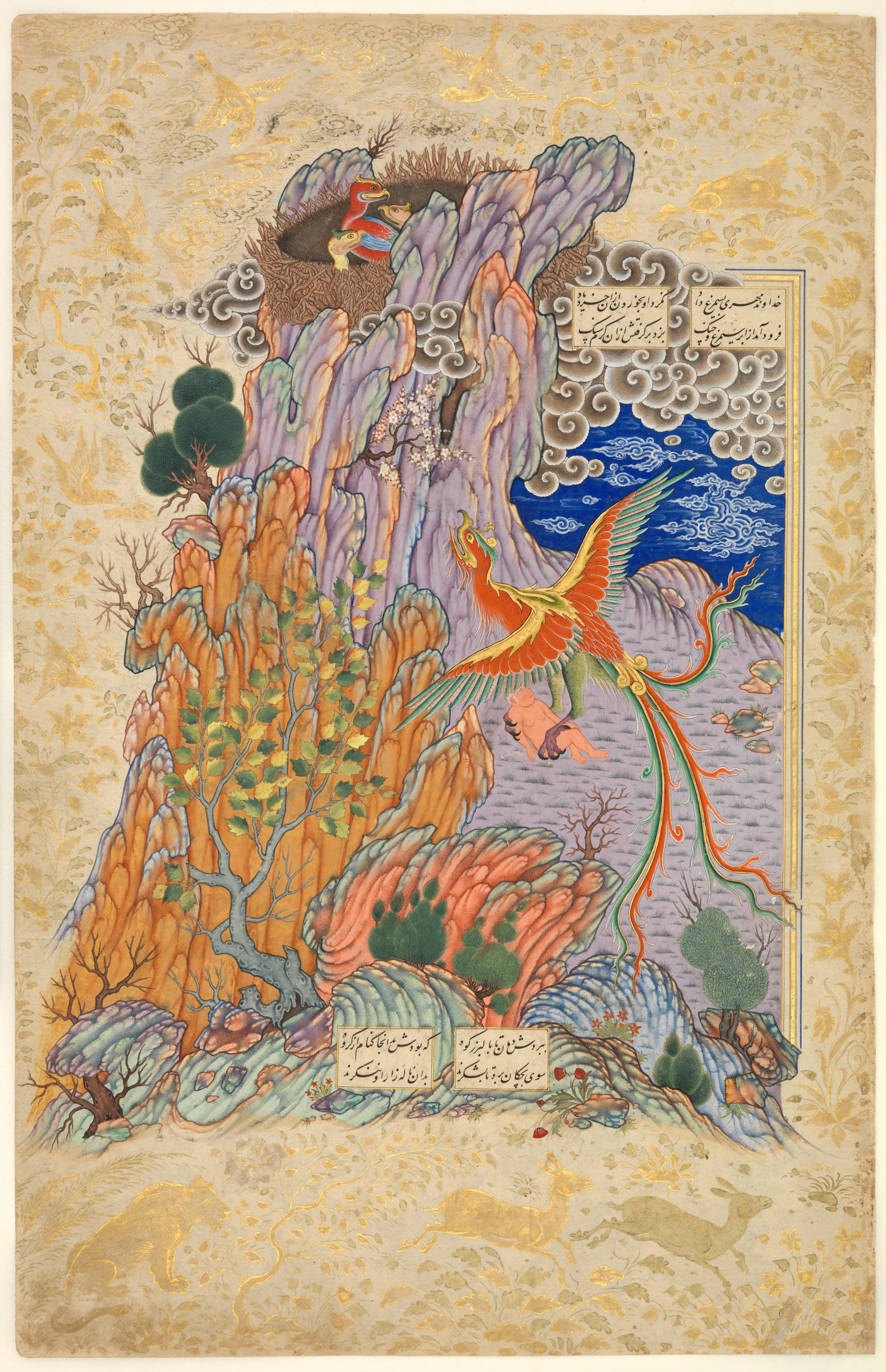
Zal Rescued by the Simurgh by Sadiqi Beg. Miniature from the Shahnameh commissioned by Shah Abbas I. Probably Qazvin, between 1590 and 1600

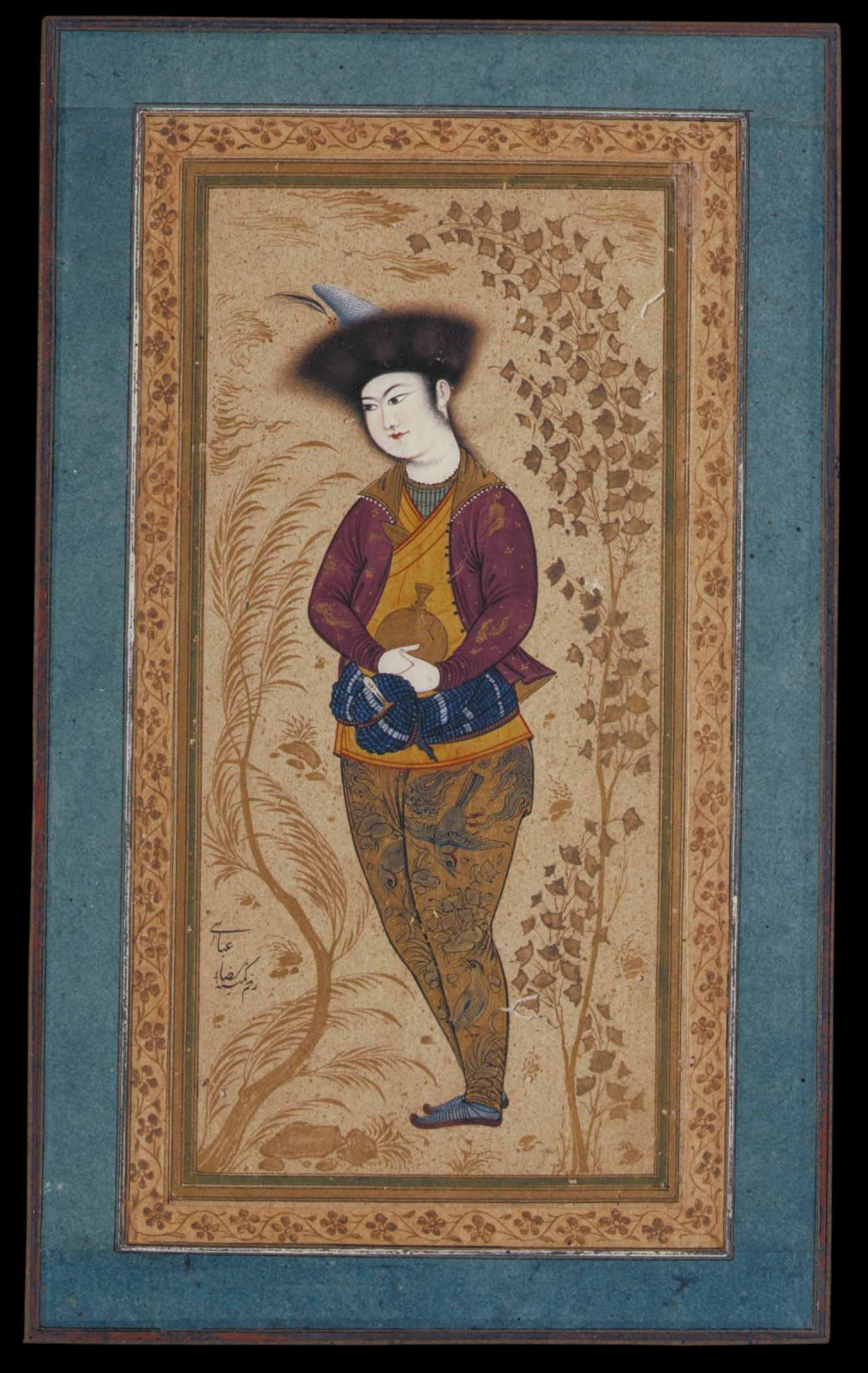
Young man in a fur hat by Reza Abbasi. Isfahan, between 1600 and 1625

=== Syriac collection ===
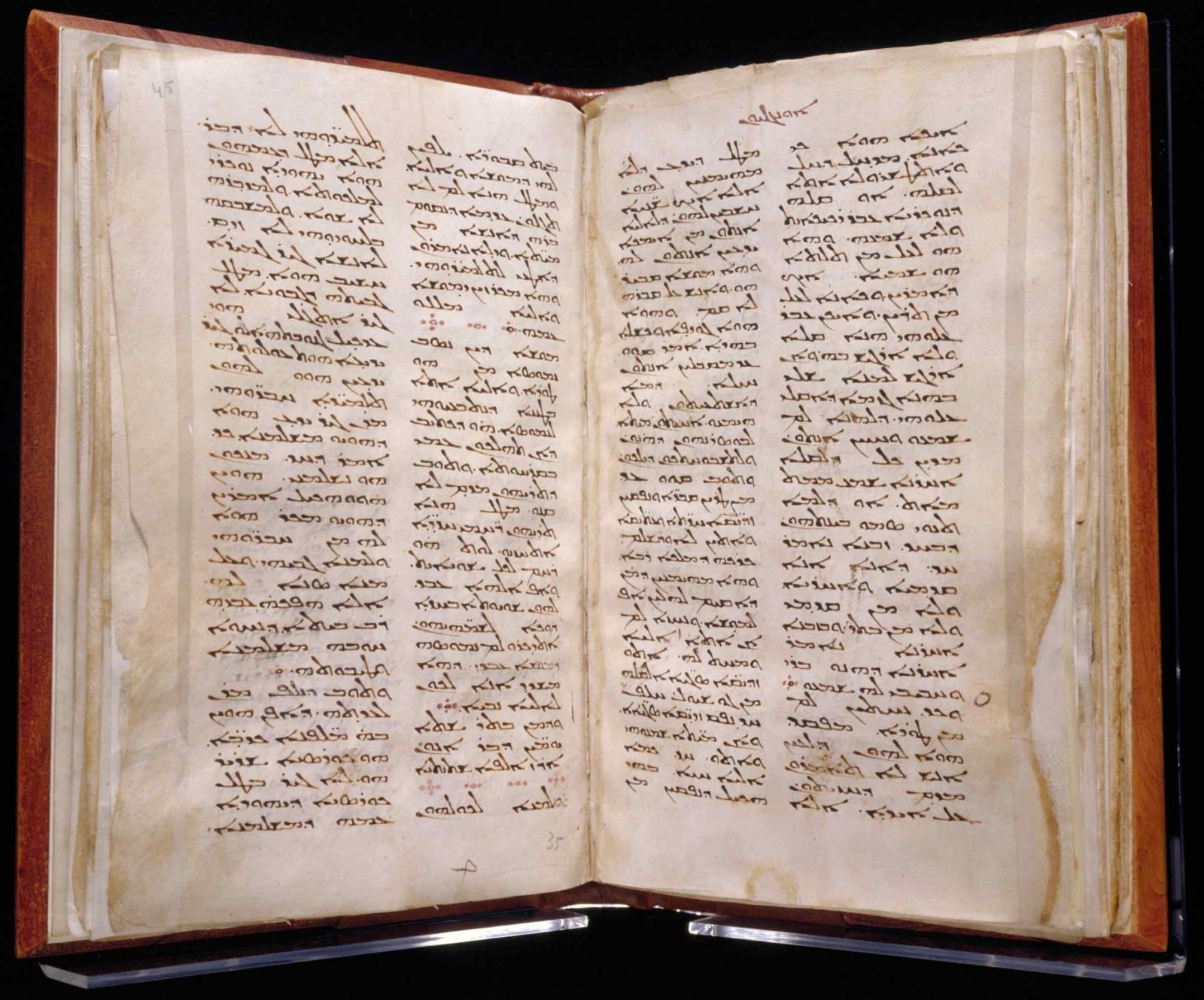
Parchment manuscript of the Ephrem's Commentary on the Diatessaron and an exchange of letters between Severus of Antioch and Julian of Halicarnassus. Egypt, late 5th or early 6th century and 8th or 9th century

=== Thai collection ===
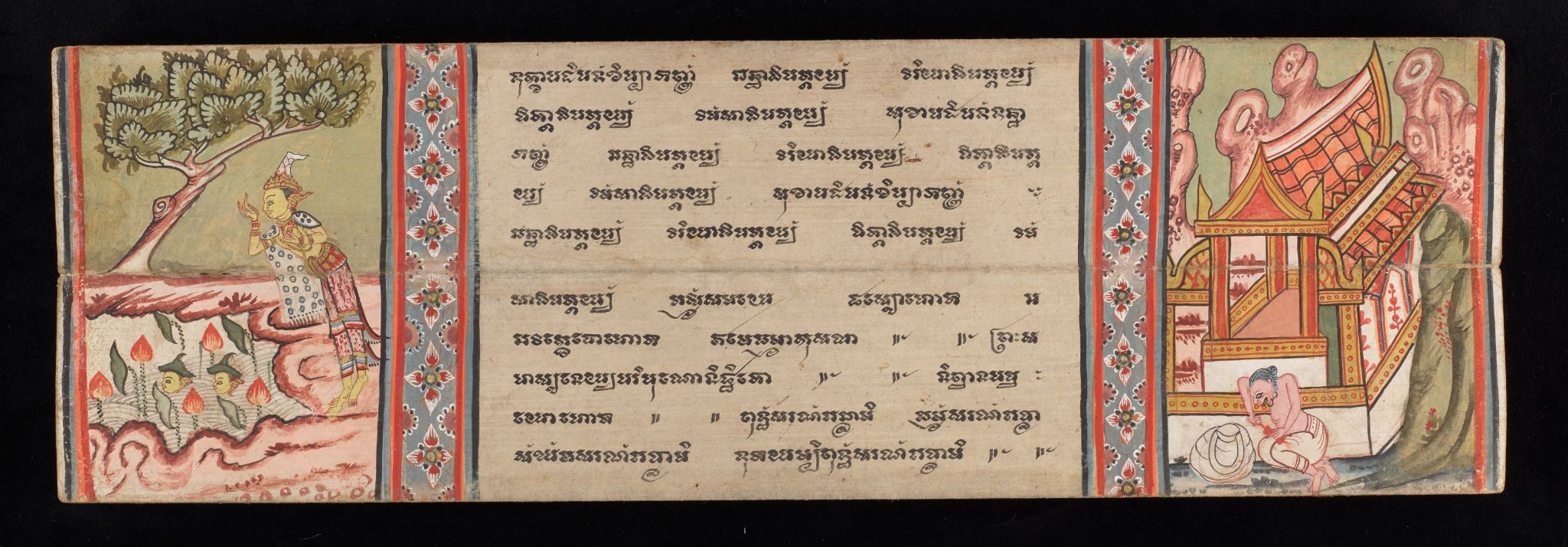
Extracts from the Pali canon (Tipitaka) and Qualities of the Buddha (Mahabuddhaguna). Thailand, late 18th century

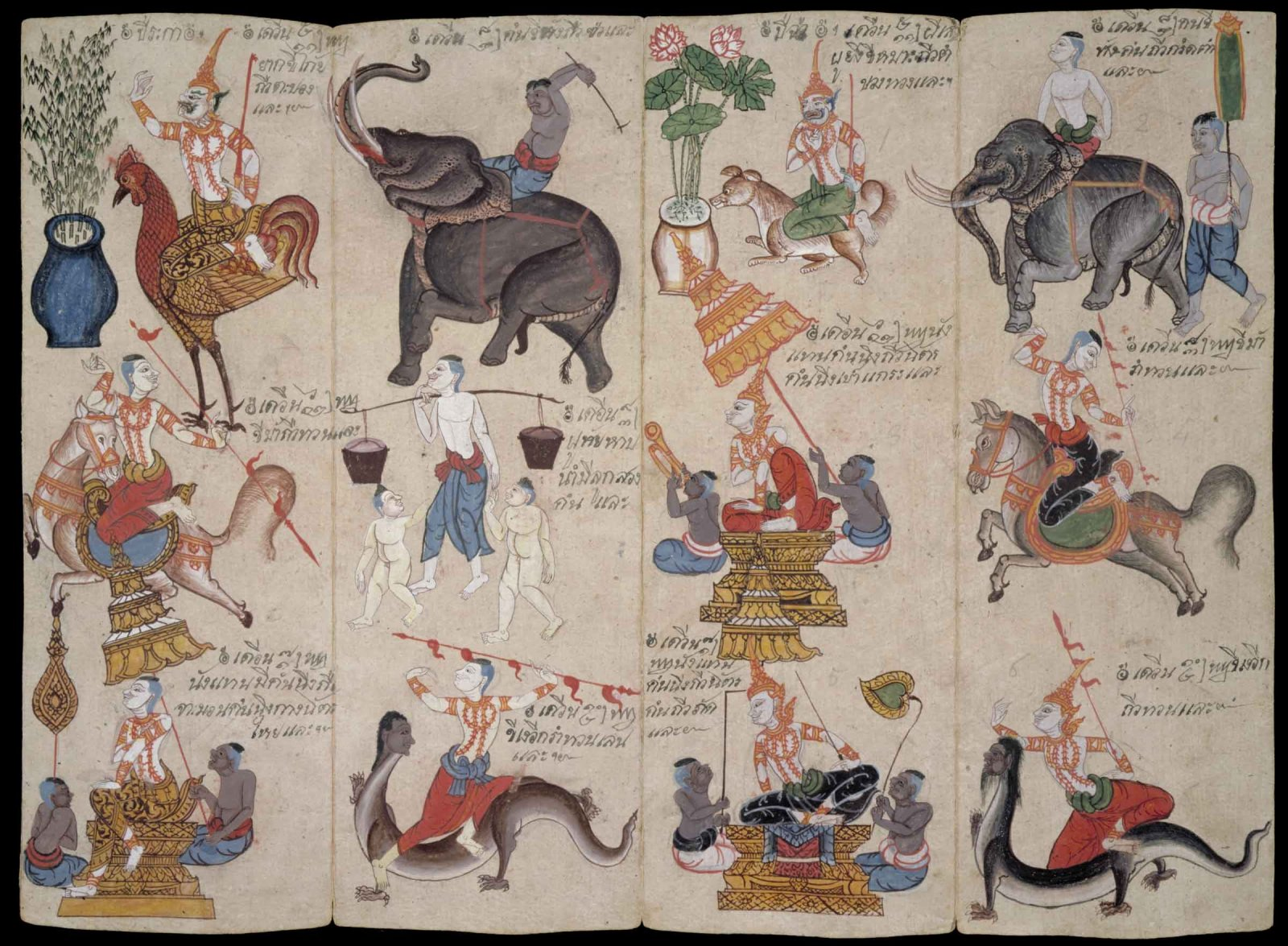
Fortune-Telling Manual (Phrommachat) with the twelve animals of the Thai zodiac and their associated attributes, avatars and plants. Thailand, c. 1845

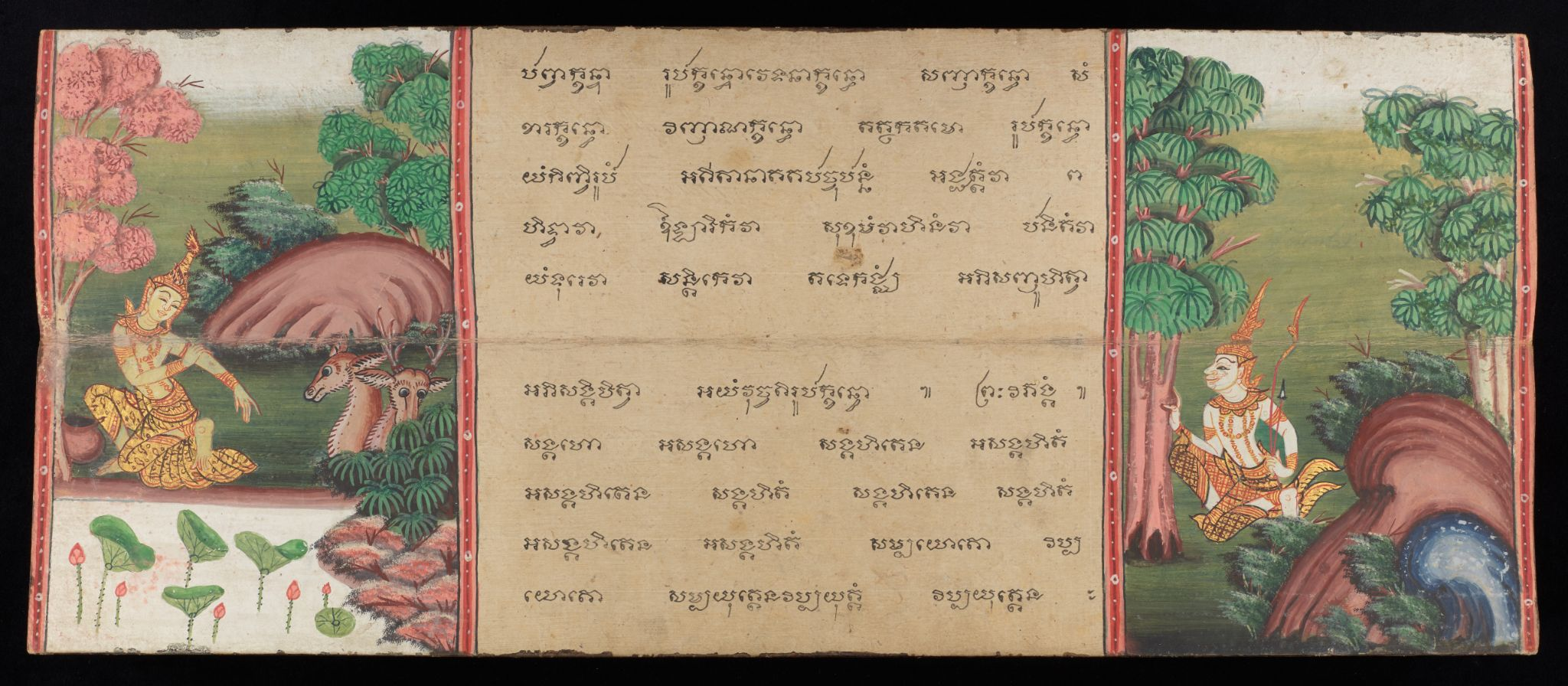
Extracts from the Pali canon (Tipitaka) and Story of Phra Malai. Thailand, late 19th century

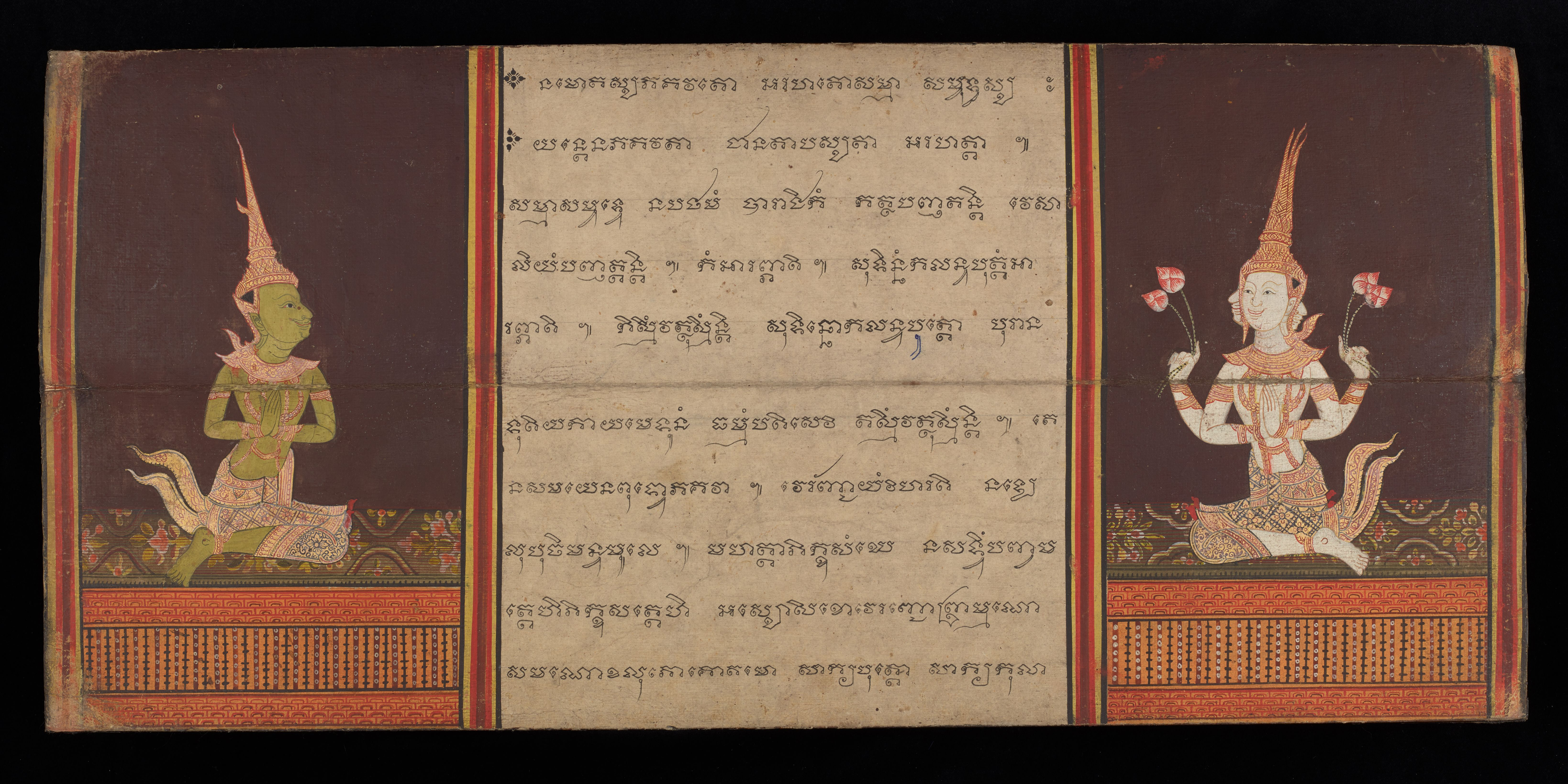
Extracts from the Pali canon (Tipitaka) and Story of Phra Malai. Thailand, 1897

=== Tibetan collection ===
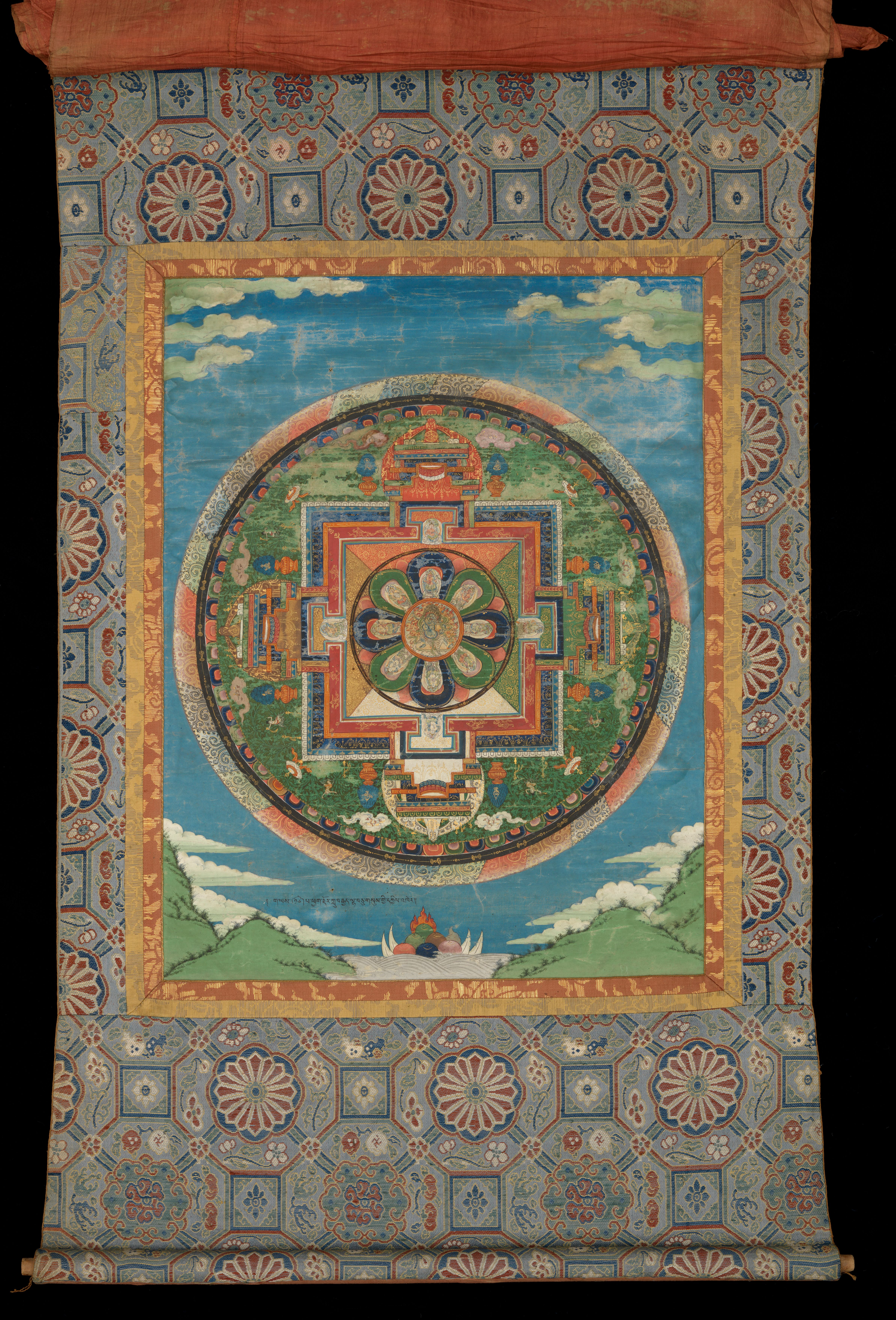
Vajrapani Mandala. Thangka. Tibet, 18th or 19th century

=== Turkish collection ===
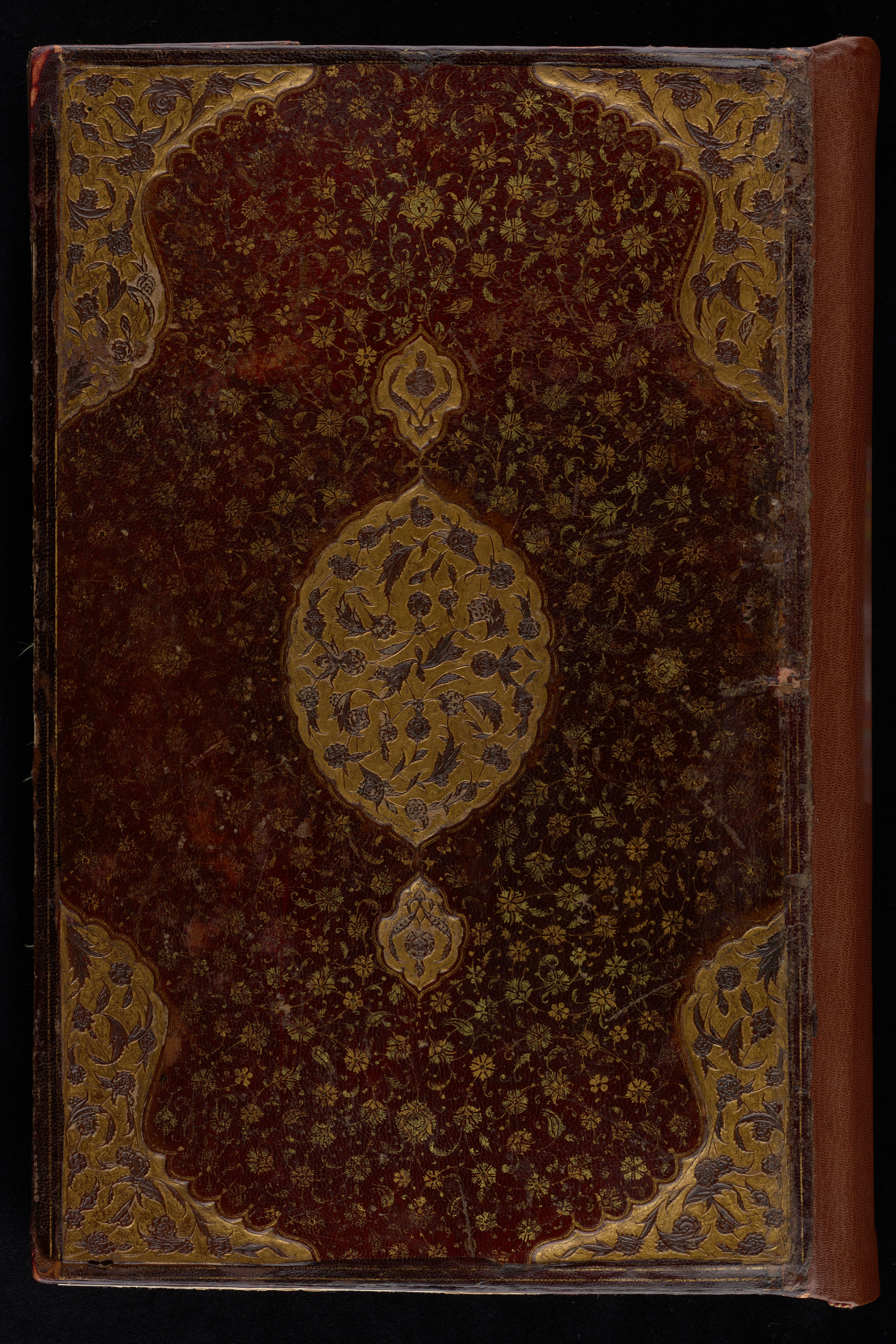
Binding from "The Cream of Histories" (Zubdat al-tawarikh). Istanbul, 1585-1590

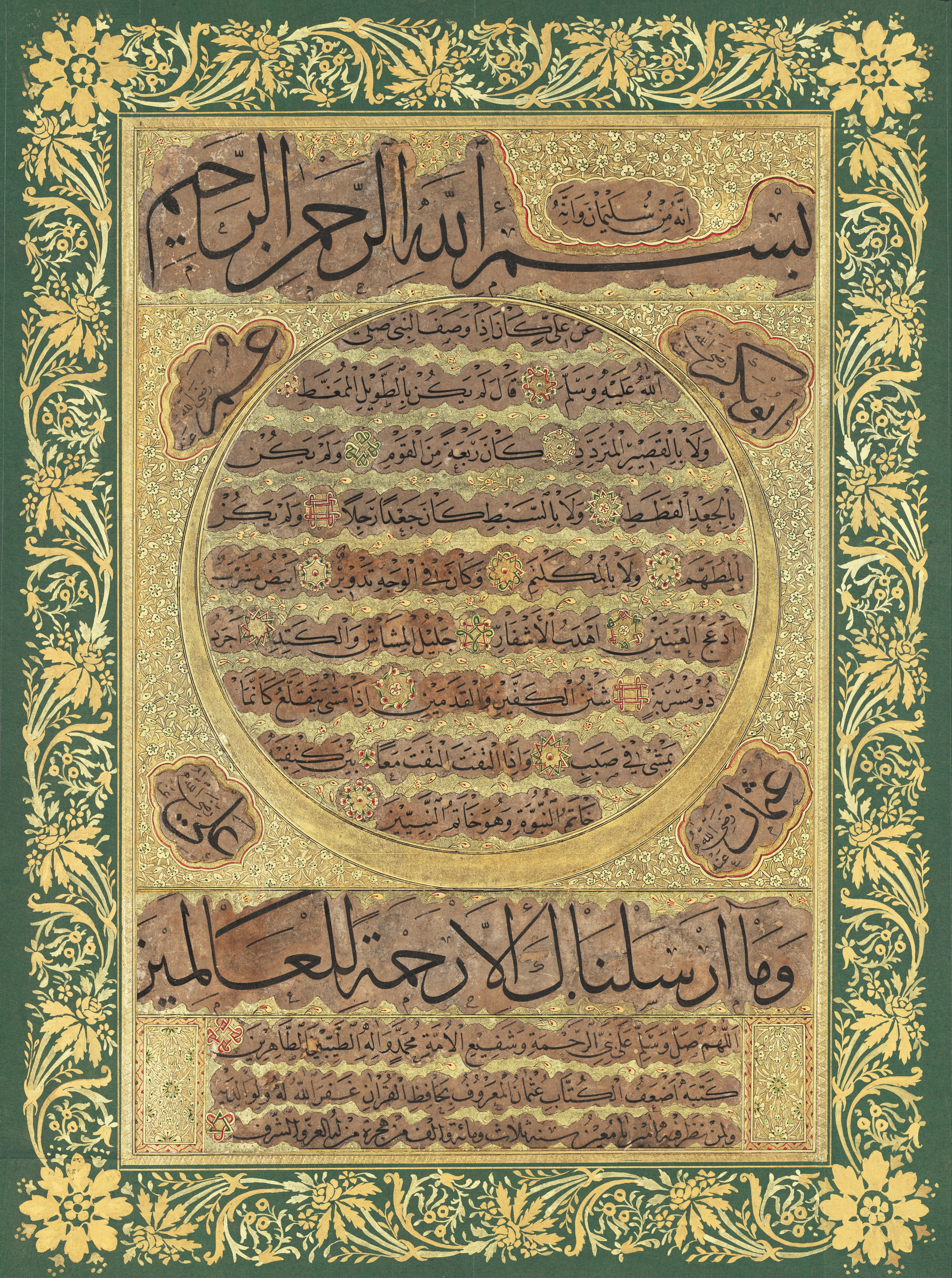
Description of the Prophet (Hilya al-nabi), by Hâfiz Osman. Istanbul, 1691/1692

=== Western collection ===
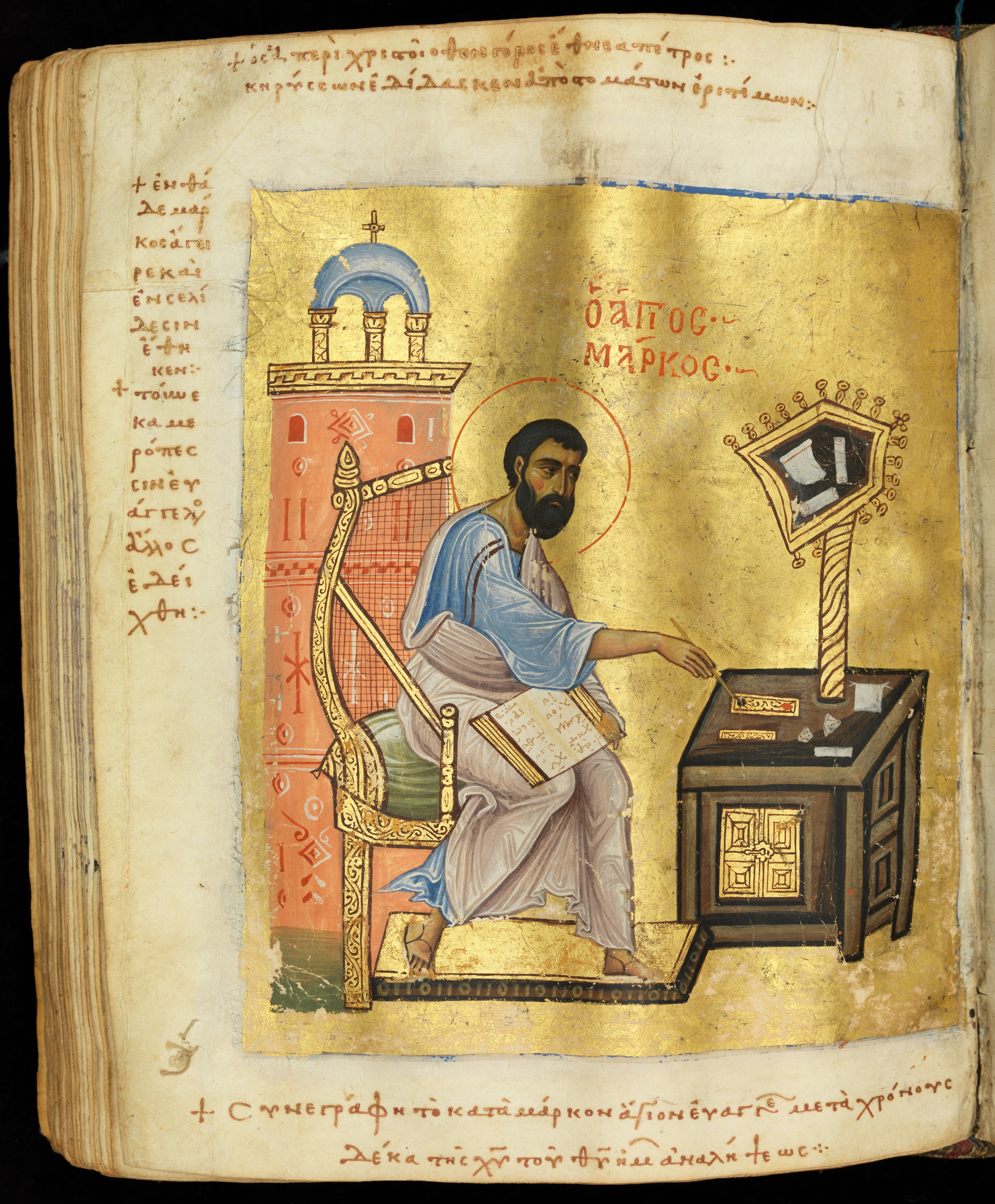
Byzantine Gospel Book, c. 1100

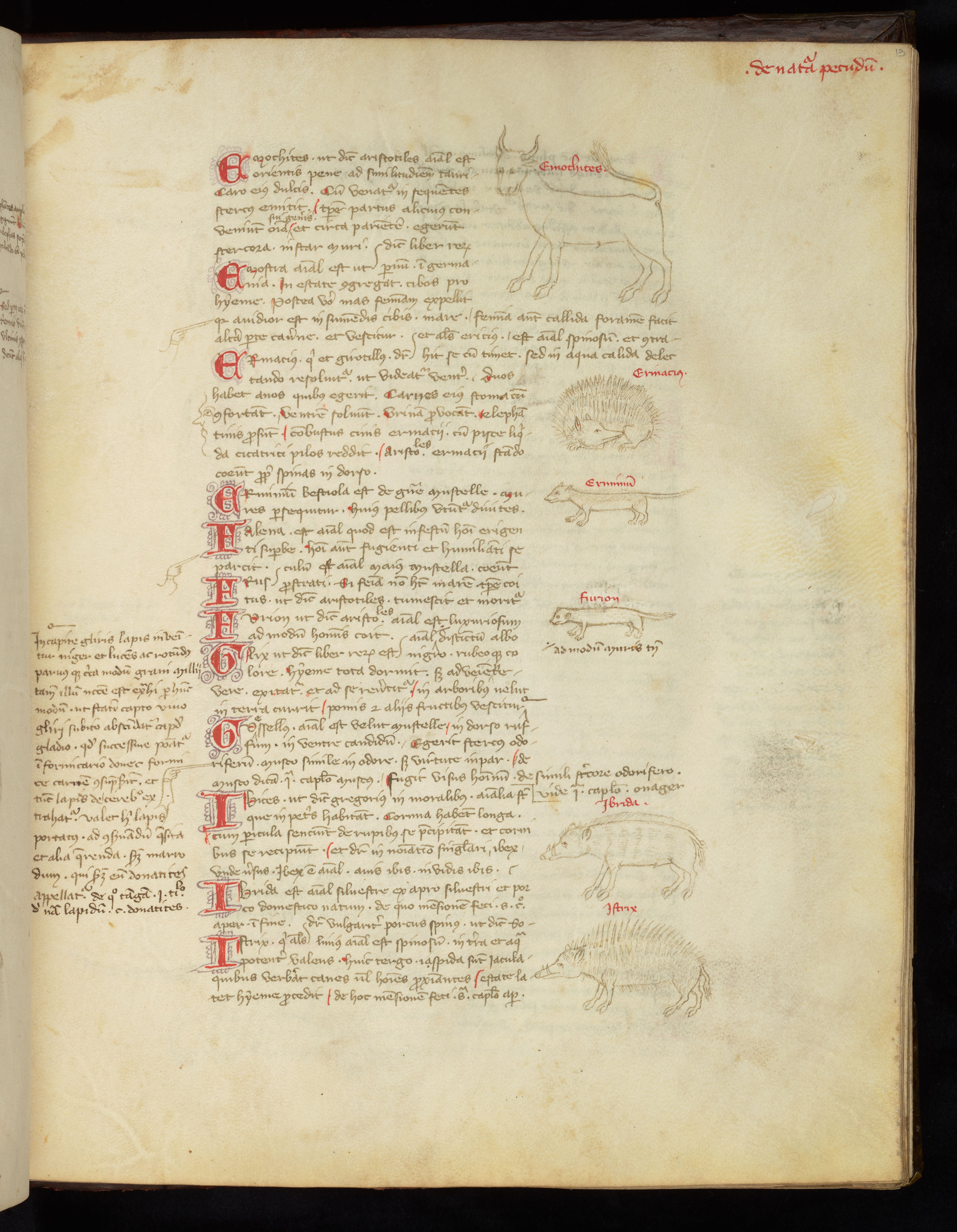
'Garden of knowledge (Viridarium)', a medieval encyclopaedia by Jean Reynaud. Probably Avignon, between 1386 and 1425

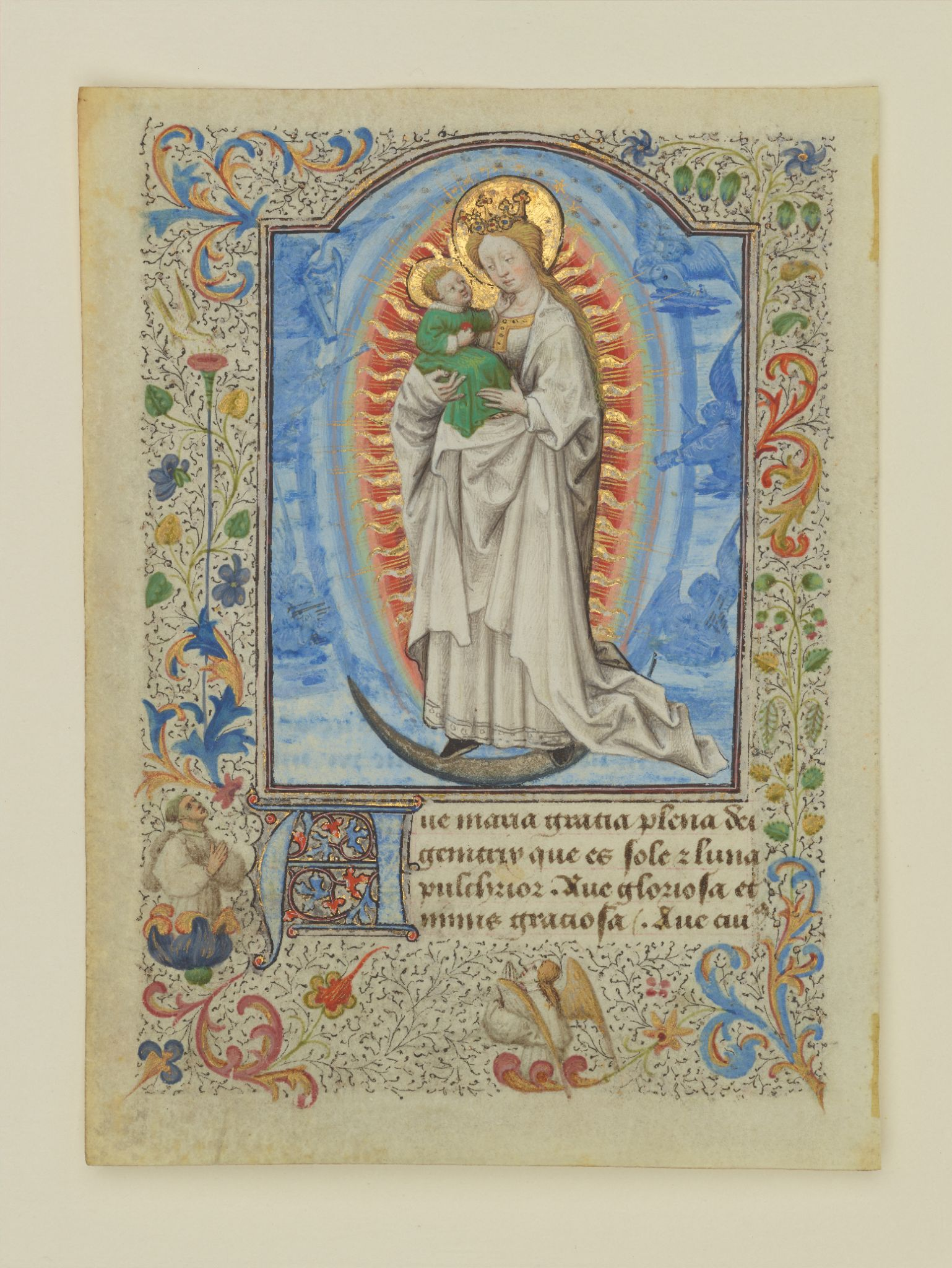
The Coëtivy Hours by the Dunois Master. Paris, 1443-1445

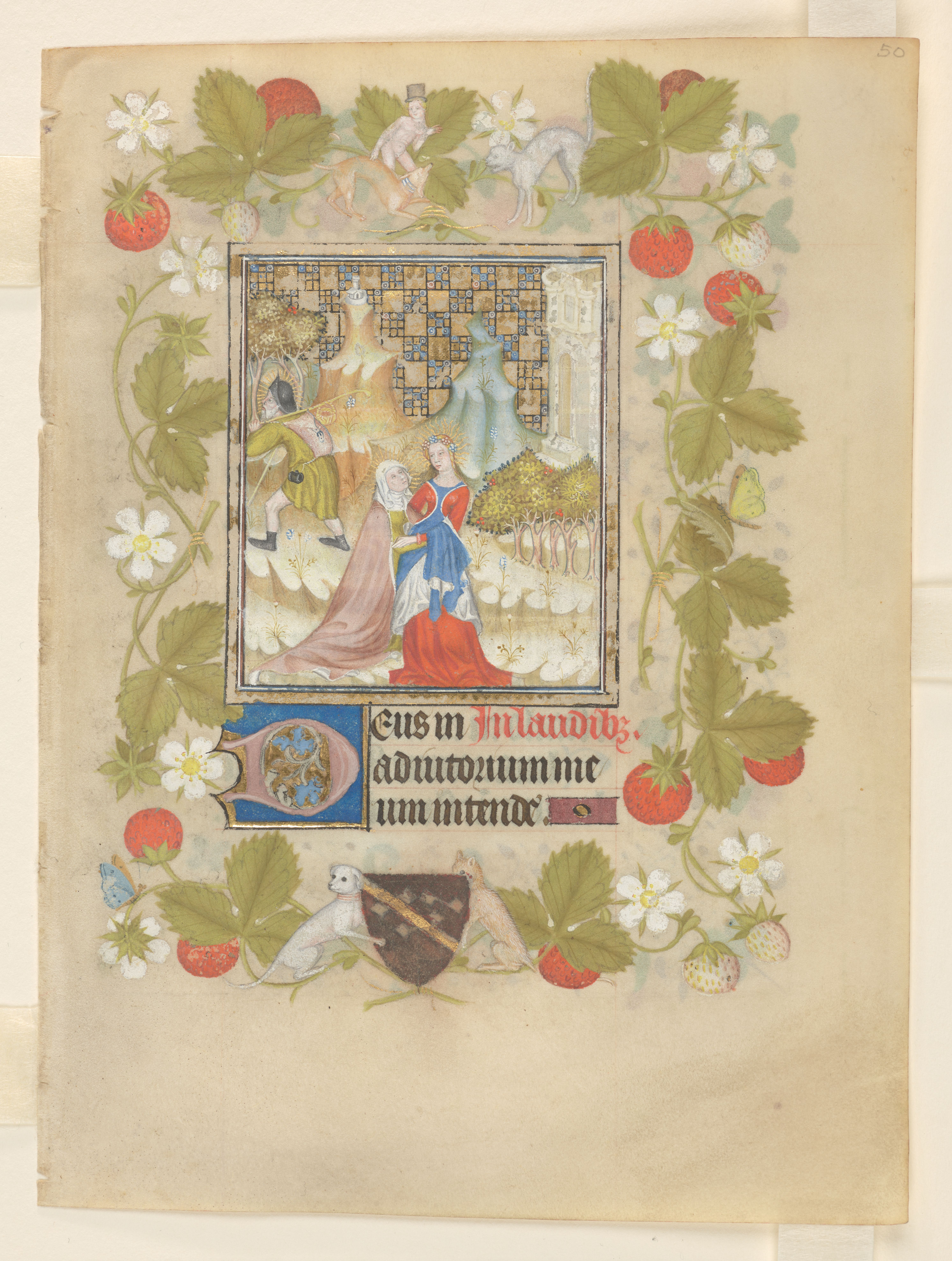
The Hamilton Field Book of Hours by the Master of Walters 219. Paris, 1412–1420

=== Western Miscellaneous collection ===
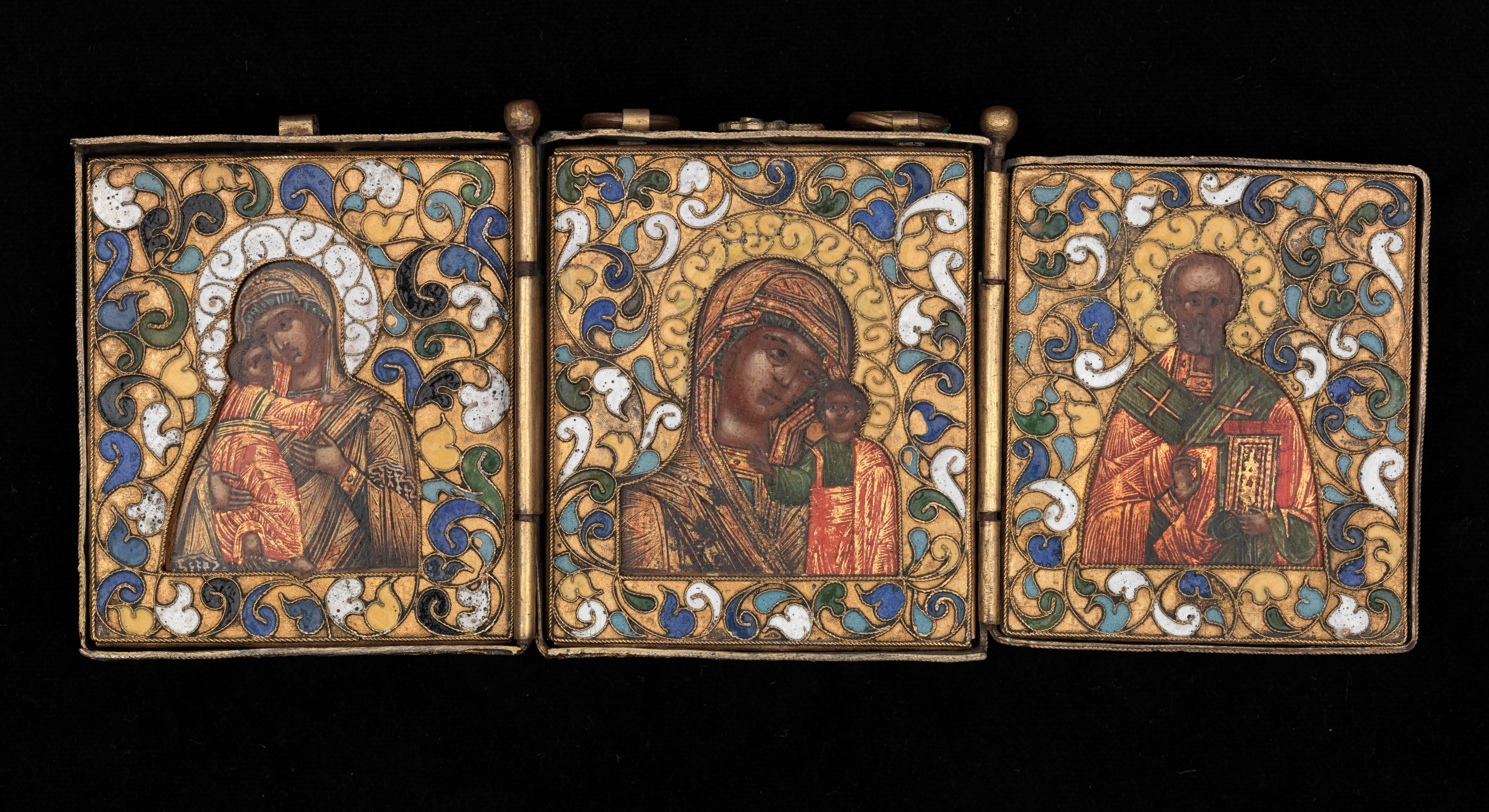
Triptych with Virgin and Child and St Nicholas. Russia, c. 1800

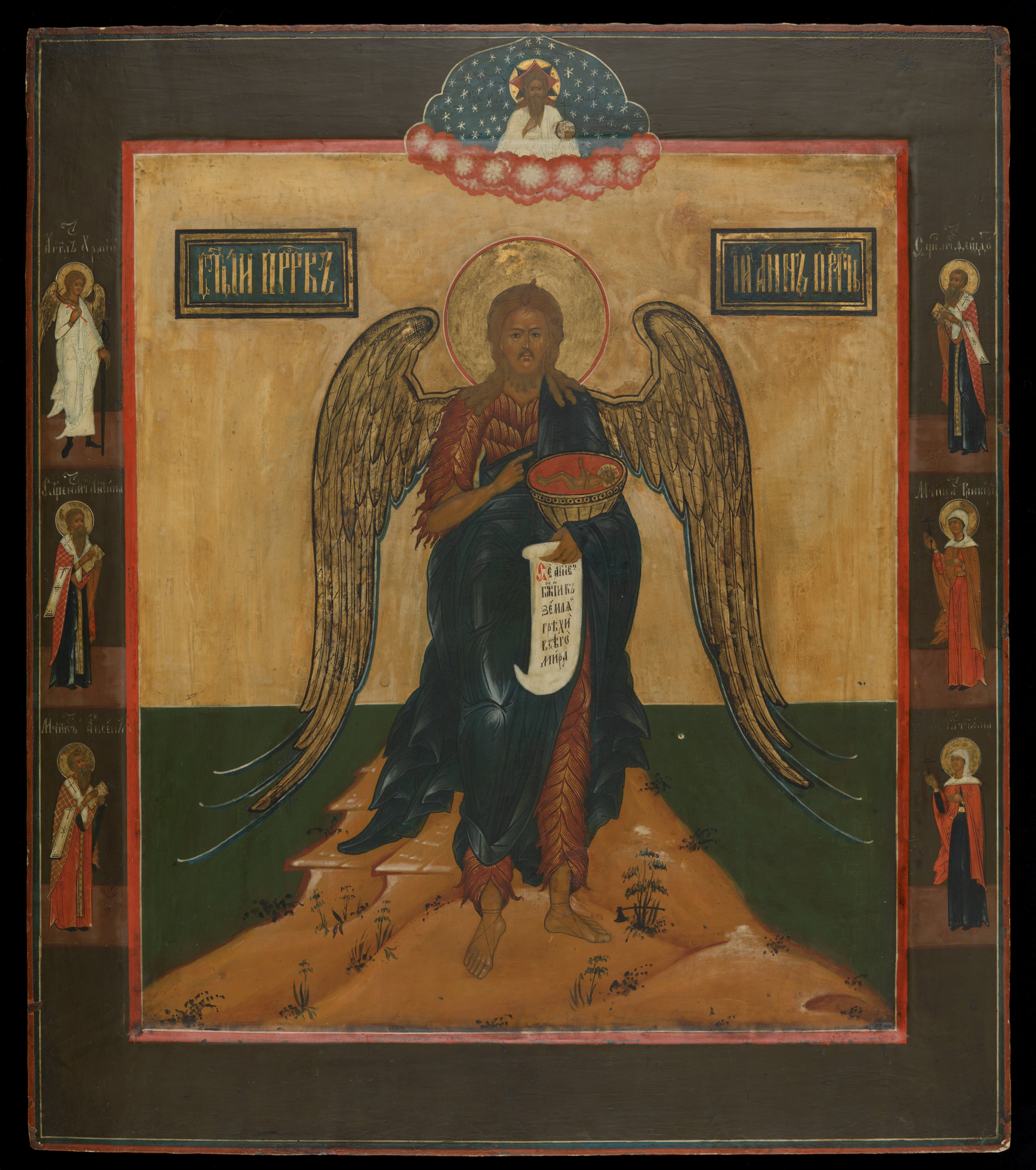
St John the Forerunner. Russia, 19th century

=== Western Prints and Drawings collection ===
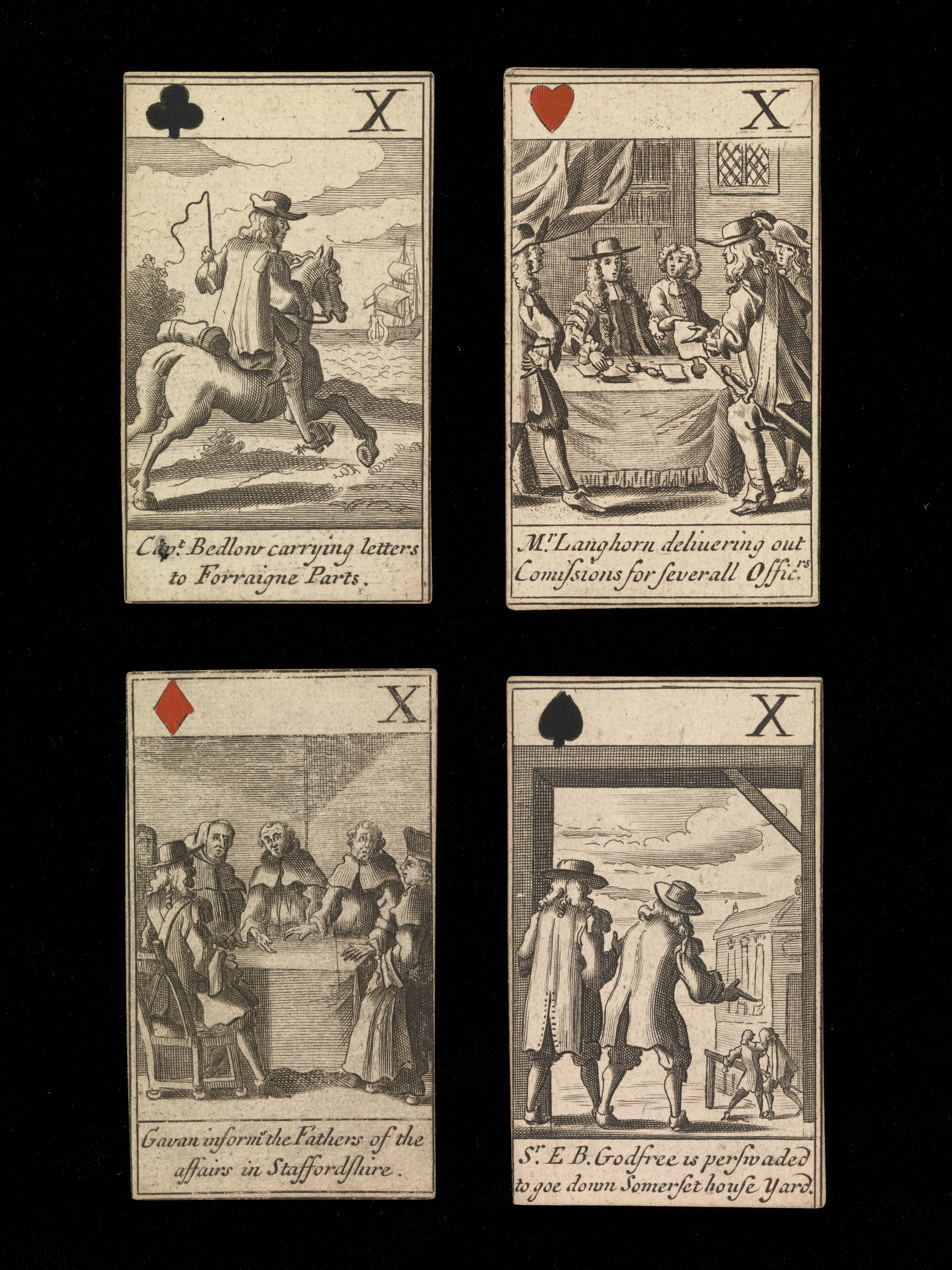
Popish Plot Playing Cards, after Francis Barlow. England, c. 1679

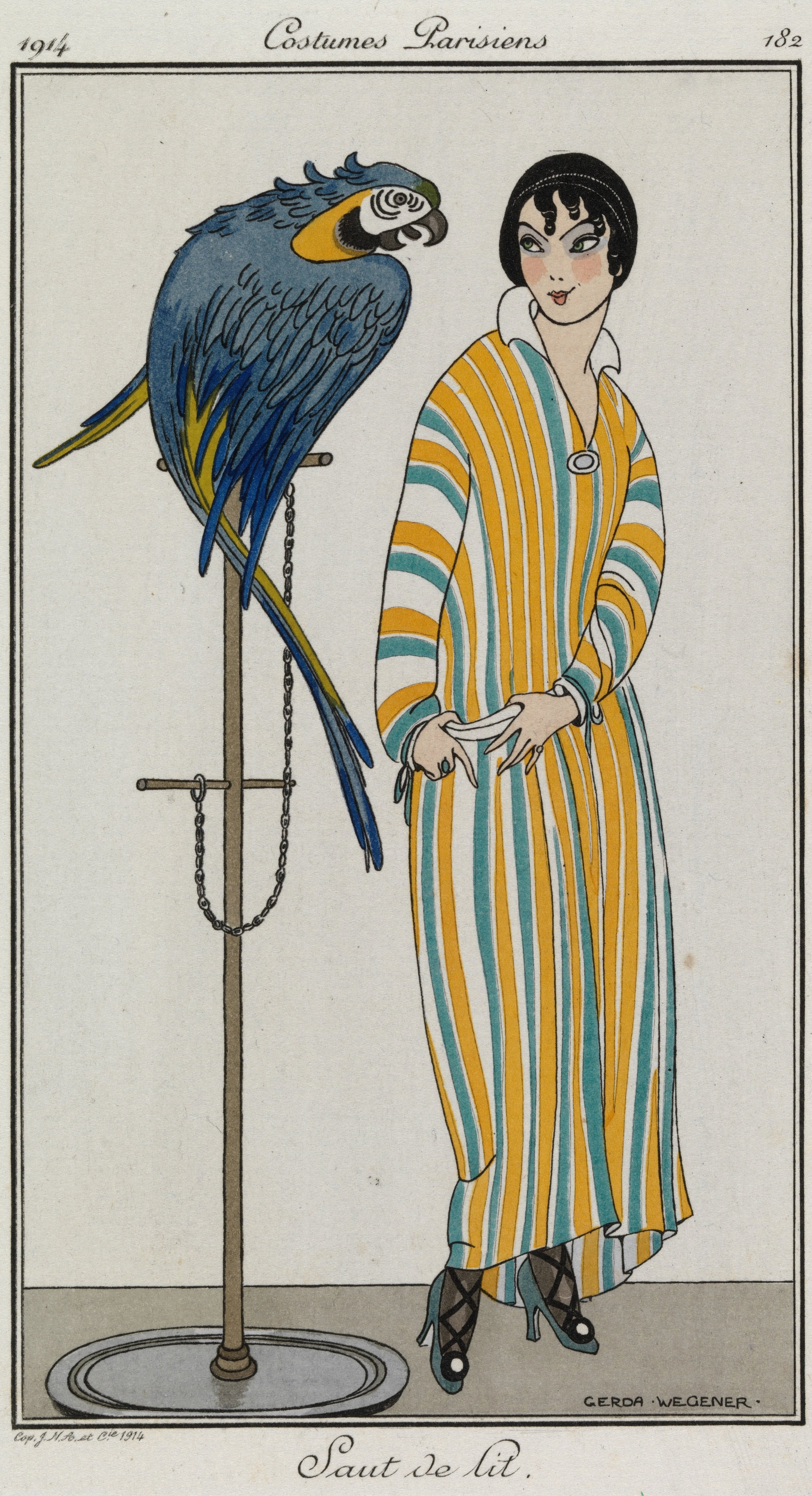
Dressing gown (Saut de lit). Fashion plate after Gerda Wegener. Paris, Journal des Dames et des Modes, 20 July 1914 (no. 78)

=== Others ===
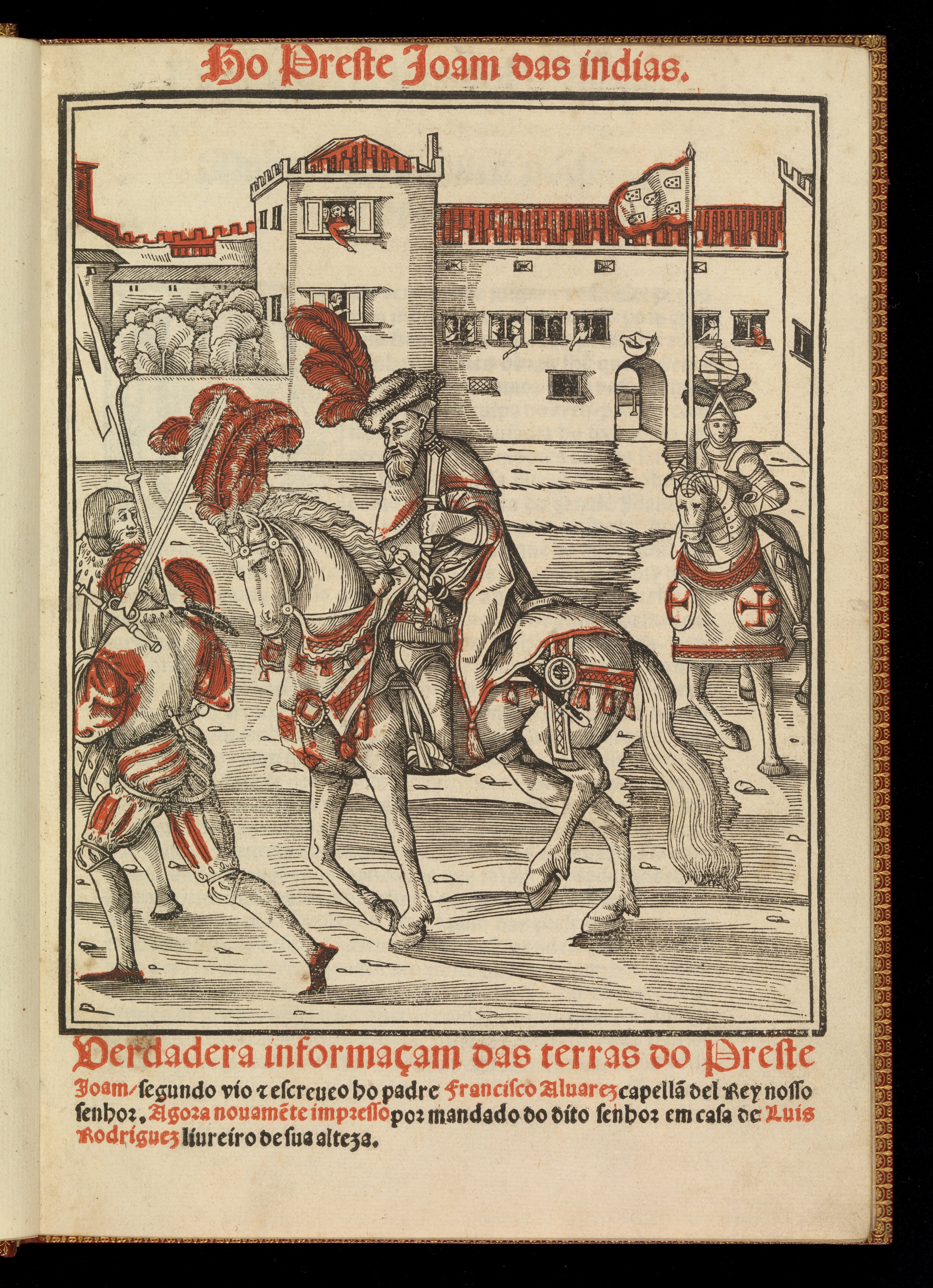
First edition of 'The Prester John of the India' (Ho Preste Joam das Indias) by Francisco Álvares. Lisbon, 1540

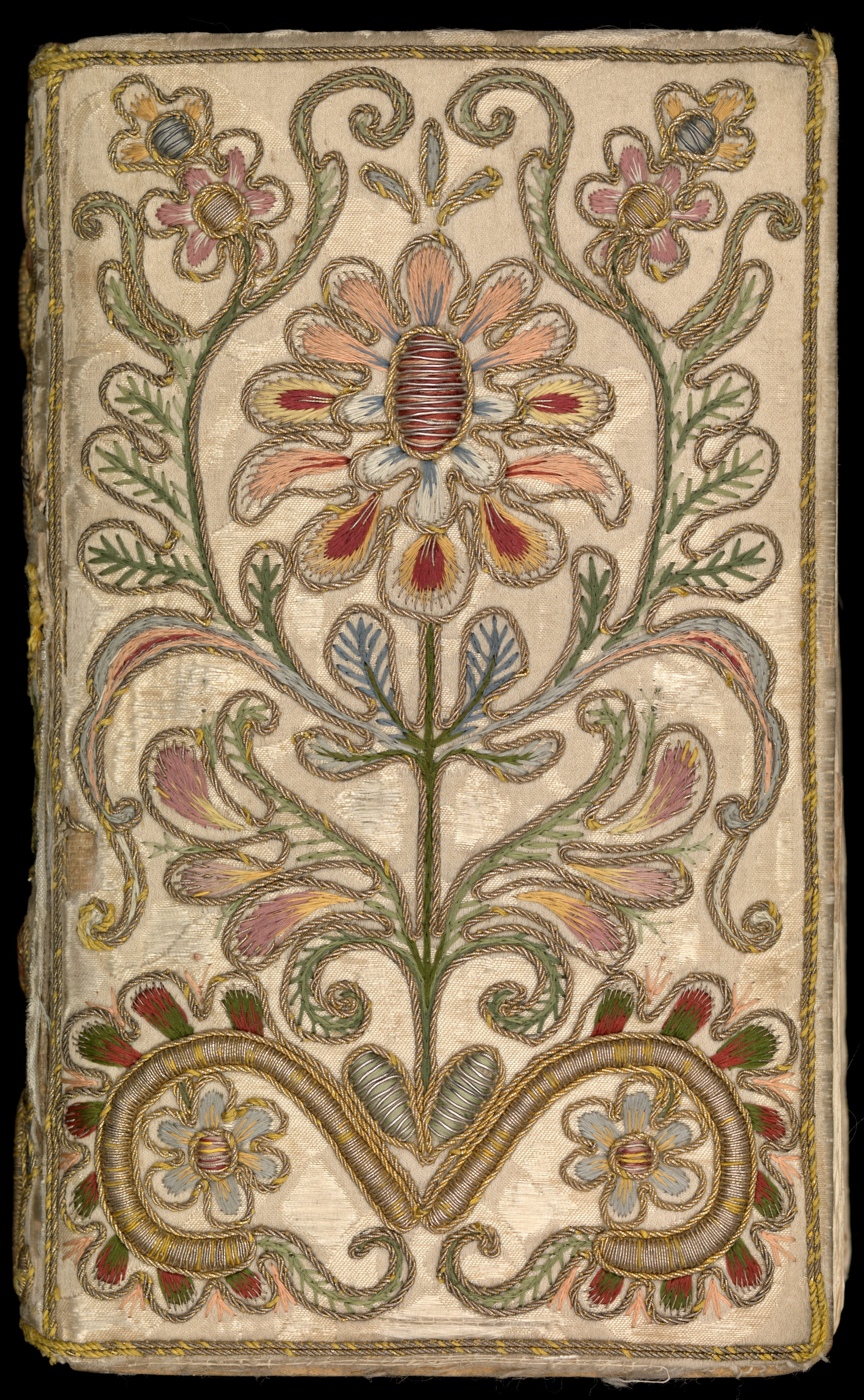
Embroidered Binding. Possibly an Italian 18th-century binding of white silk Damask. The Book of Common Prayer and administration of the sacraments

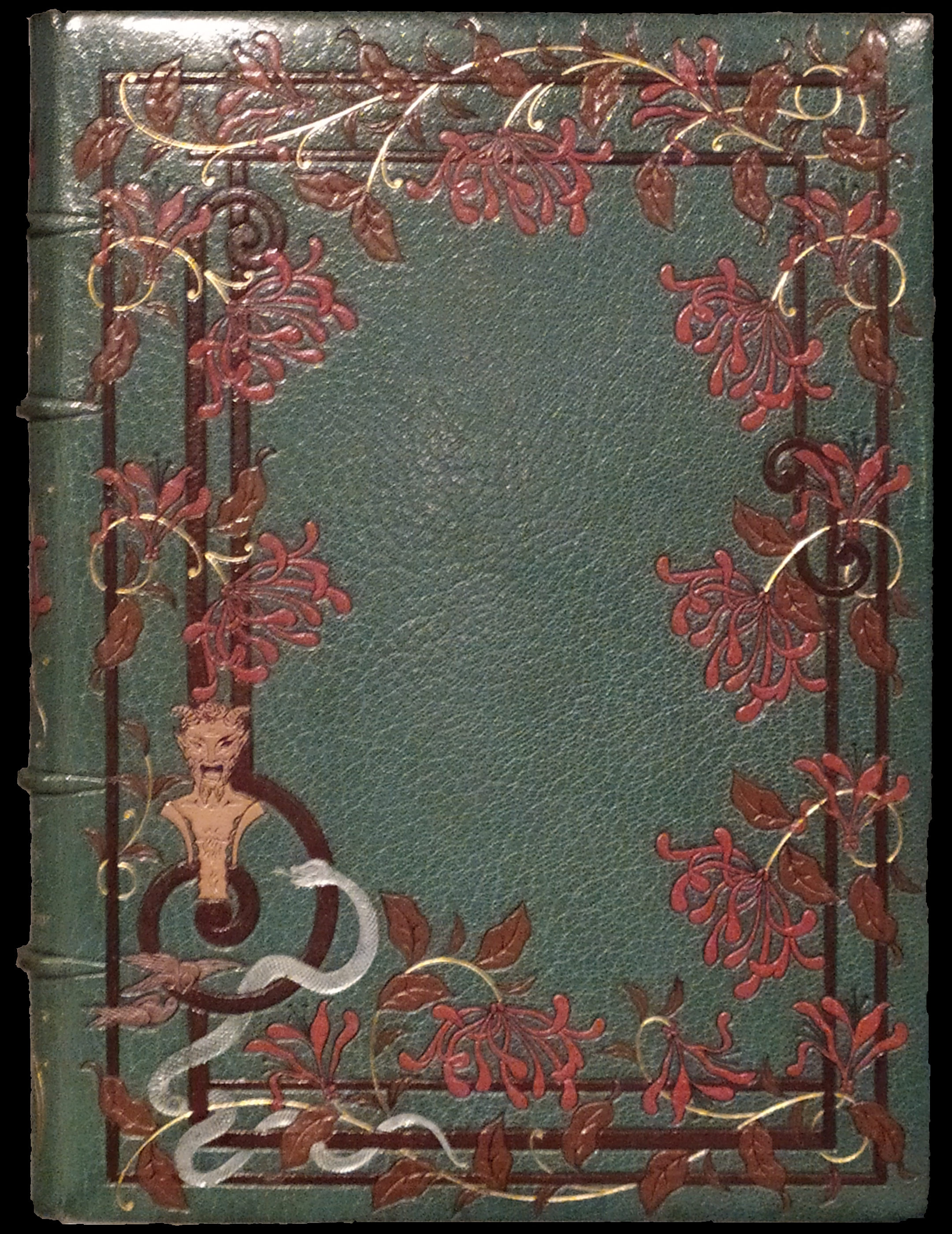
Art Nouveau binding by Charles Meunier. Paris, 1897

== See also ==
- List of libraries in the Republic of Ireland
