= Master of Walters 219 =

15th-century French artist

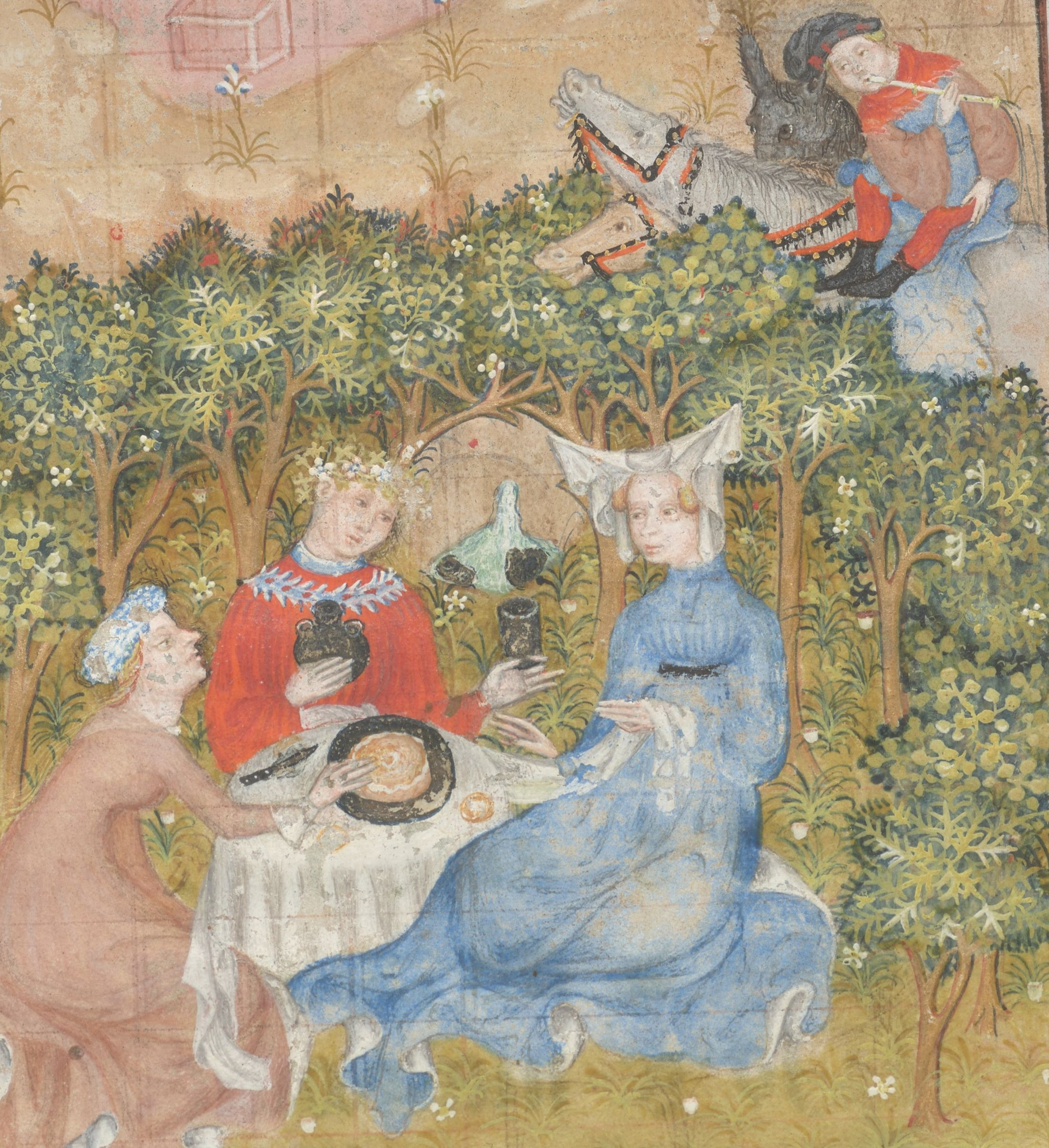
Detail of the illustration for the month of May, from the Hamilton Field Book of Hours by the Master of Walters 219

The Master of Walters 219 was an artist making illuminated manuscripts in eastern France during the early 15th century. The notname is derived from an illuminated book of hours in the Walters Art Museum. The artists produced at least seven such illustrated books, including the Hamilton Field Book of Hours in the Chester Beatty Library in Dublin. It was an artist who was strongly influenced by Italian Trecento painting, and who may have been Italian or at least trained in Italy. The Master of Walters 219 had a style that was relatively innovative, depicting plants and wildlife in an increasingly realistic way. The artist also painted some of only a few sets of fully developed landscapes in French illuminated manuscripts at the time.

== History and background ==
The notname of the artist derives from an illuminated manuscript, a book of hours in the collections of the Walters Art Museum, Baltimore. This manuscript was possibly the first one made by the artist and probably made around 1417. Art historian Millard Meiss speculated that the artist may have attempted to start a career in Paris around that time but failed on account of declining opportunities of patronage following the death of John, Duke of Berry. At any rate, the artist was active in eastern France, perhaps Besançon, but retained contacts with artists in Paris. The Master of Walters 219 may have been Italian, or at least trained in northern Italy. Seven manuscripts have been attributed to the Master of Walters 219 with confidence. They are all books of hours; among them the Hamilton Field Book of Hours in the Chester Beatty Library in Dublin (Ms. W 094) has been described as the most accomplished.

== Style ==
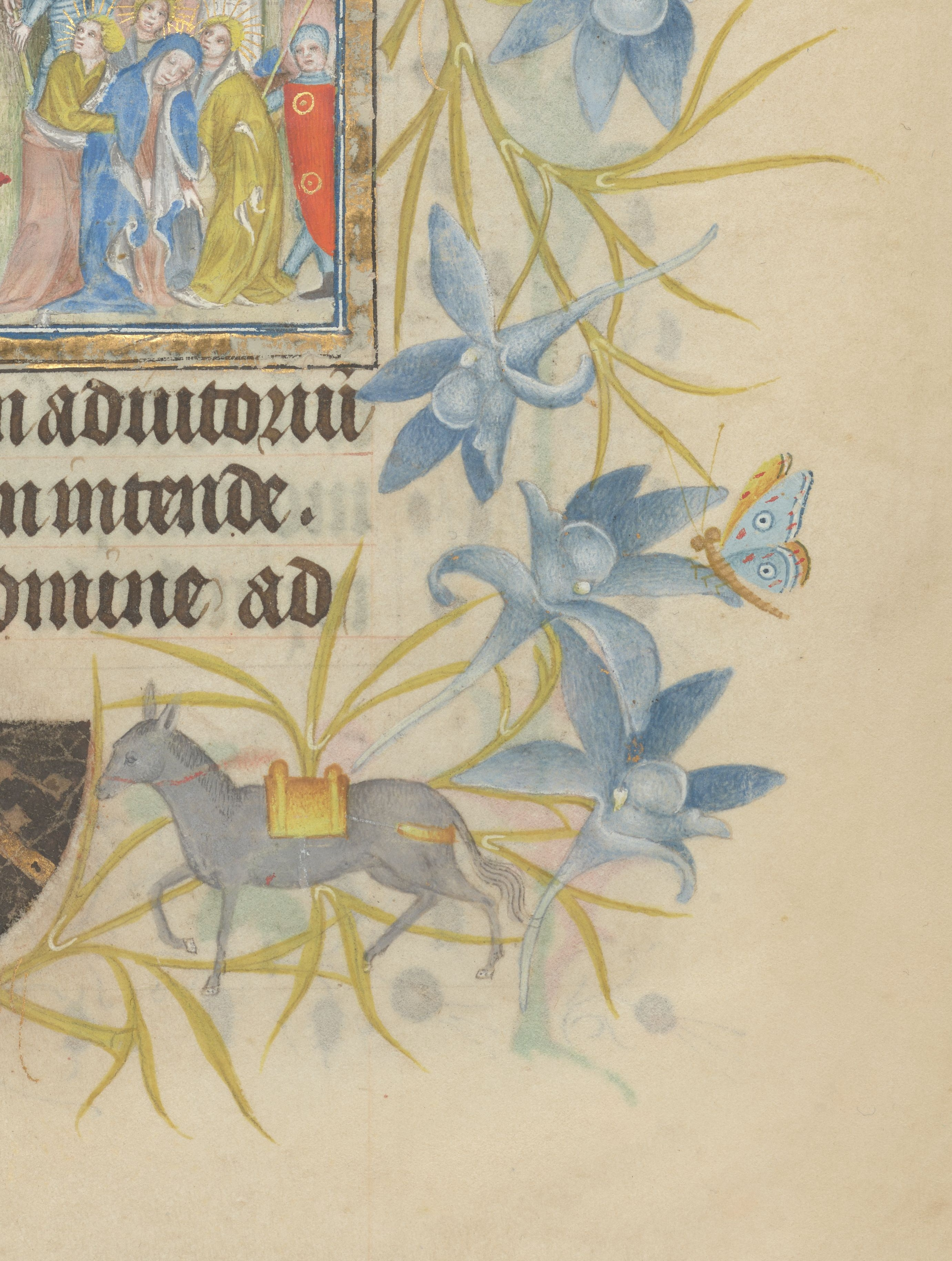
Detail with the margin of a leaf from the Hamilton Field Book of Hours, showing the realistic treatment of flowers (here larkspurs) and animals

Millard Meiss characterised the Master of Walters 219 as "the most interesting of the illuminators who remained in the provinces." He pointed to the strong influence from Italian Trecento art in the choice of pale tones of colours, a "primary concern with solid form rather than with color or light", and the inclusion of pictures of prophets in some of the inhabited initials. Some other obviously Italian influences, such as decoration in the form of male busts in some initials, had already gained popularity in France through the work of the Master of the Brussels Initials. The treatment of the decorated page borders shows a development towards novelty, in that the artist gradually abandoned the more old-fashioned use of stylised, sinuous acanthus and ivy-stems in favour of more naturalistic depictions of real flowers and fruits interspersed with insects, animals and drolleries. The inspiration for these larger and more realistic depictions of flowers may have come from north Italian herbals. The Master of Walters 219 was also increasingly innovative in the iconographic representation of subject matter. The calendar in the Hamilton Field Book of Hours is clearly inspired by the Très Riches Heures du Duc de Berry by the Limbourg brothers, and is one of few French books of hours from the period that contains fully developed depictions of landscapes. The Walters 219 manuscript, after which the artist is labelled, show even greater independence and originality, introducing several motifs rarely or never seen in books of hours before. Meiss also noted further examples of iconographic innovation, including that "he was one of the first artists to show a skeleton riding a bull", which soon after became a popular way of illustrating the Triumph of Death by Petrarch and also made its way into books of hours towards the end of the 15th century.
