= Master of the Brussels Initials =

14th- and 15th-century manuscript illuminator

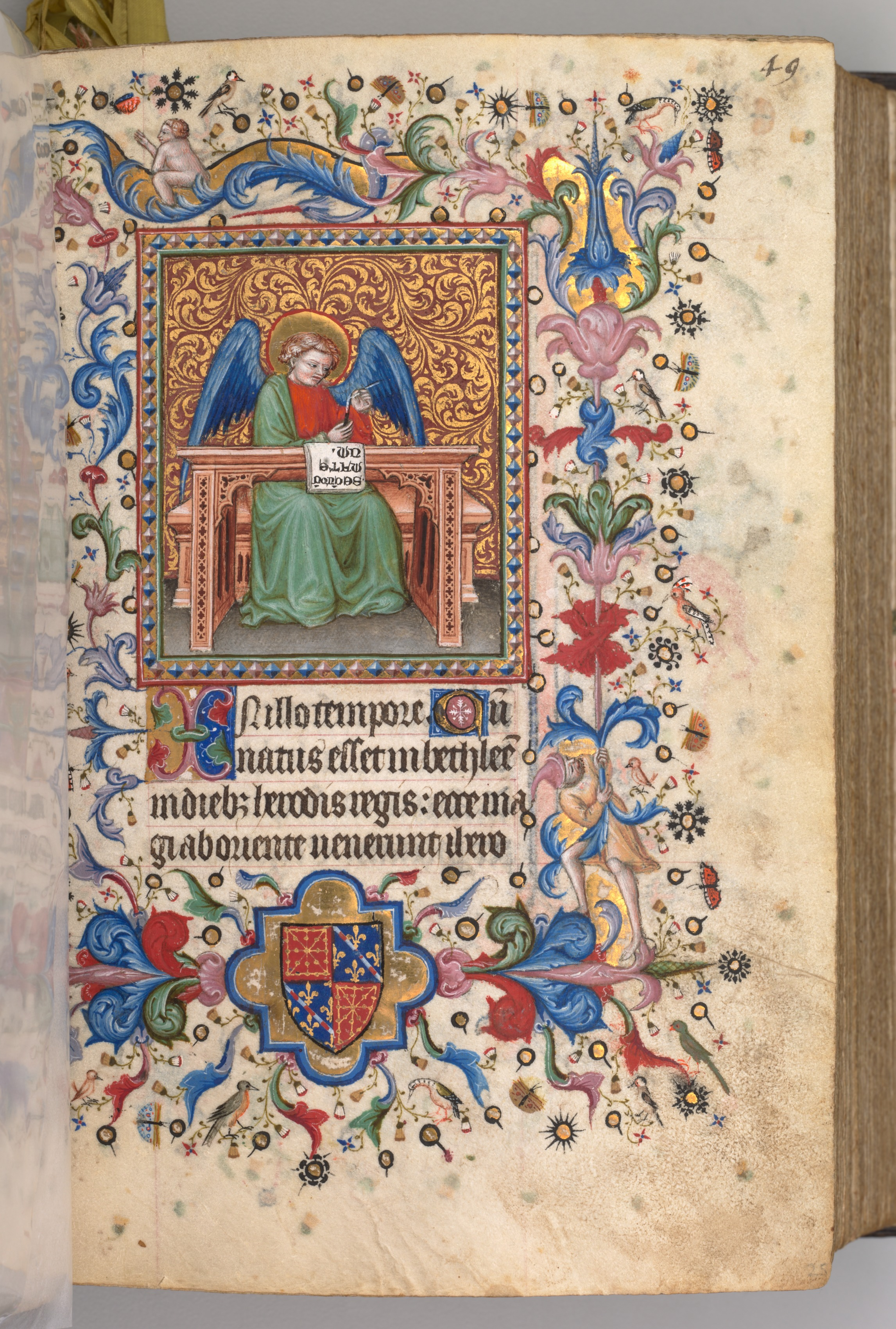
Matthew, painted by the Master of the Brussels Initials in the Hours of Charles the Noble

The Master of the Brussels Initials (fl. c. 1390–1410), previously identified with Zebo da Firenze, was a manuscript illuminator active mainly in Paris. He (Note: The illuminator is consistently referred to as a man in the sources cited in this article.) brought Italian influences to French manuscript illumination and in that way played an important role in the development of the so-called International Gothic style. Decorations by the artist appear in several different works, illustrated by several different artists, and some attributions have been questioned. A corpus of works attributable to the Master of the Brussels Initials was initially identified by art historians Otto Pächt and Millard Meiss. The artist's style was inventive, bright and lively, and G. Evelyn Hutchinson has also pointed out the unusually realistic depictions of minute wildlife found in his work. John, Duke of Berry, one of the greatest bibliophiles of the Middle Ages, commissioned works from the Master of the Brussels Initials.

== Biography ==
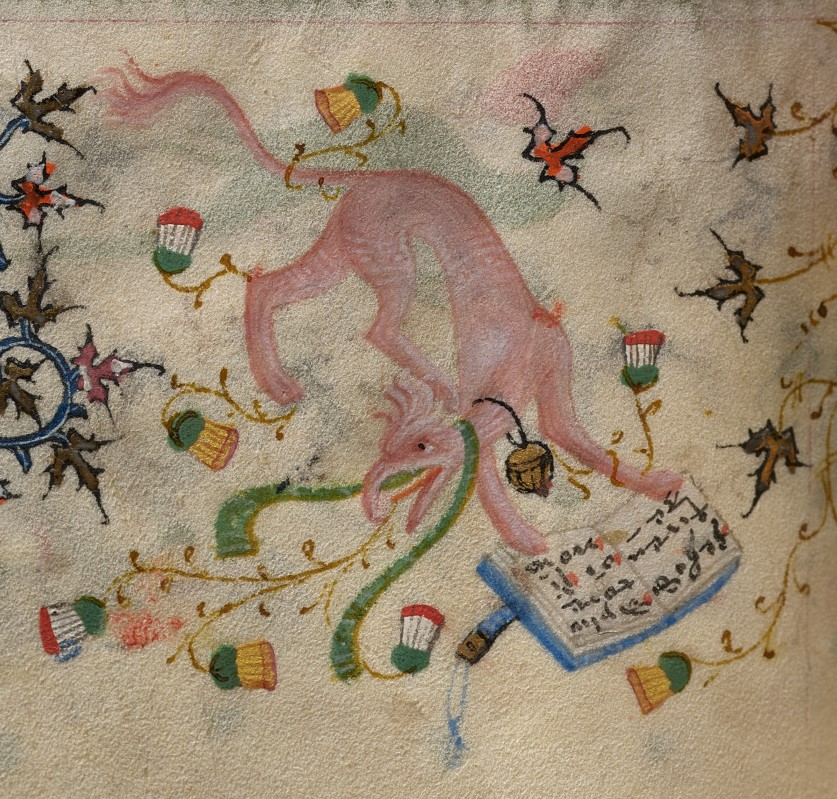
Detail in the margins of the Hours of Charles the Noble, once interpreted as a signature of the artist

The exact identity of the artist has not been established. Otto Pächt thought the artist could be identified with one Zebo or Zanobi da Firenze, but this attribution has since been rejected. The identification was based on a single inscription, first identified by Jean Porcher and difficult to read, in the margins of a page in a book of hours made for Charles III of Navarre, the Hours of Charles the Noble. An open book held by a griffin would supposedly contain the words "Zebo da Firenze". Pächt deduced that this would be identical with a painter called Zanobi da Firenze, known from archives. However, the name Zebo is not an abbreviation or a substitute for the name Zanobi, and the Zanobi mentioned in the archives appears to have lived later than the illuminator. It has furthermore been proposed that the inscription was made by another, secondary illustrator, and could be interpreted as "Zecho di Firenze".

Instead the notname "Master of the Brussels Initials" has been accepted for the artist. The name is derived from a series of historiated initials in Les Très Belles Heures du duc de Berry, a sumptuous book of hours which is part of the collections of the Royal Library of Belgium in Brussels. It seems clear that he came from Italy, and probably worked in Bologna before moving to Paris around 1400 or somewhat earlier.

== Works and style ==
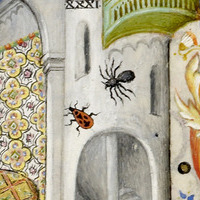
Detail depicting a Pyrrhocoris apterus, from a book in the British Library

Millard Meiss identified, together with Pächt, a corpus of works attributable to the Master of the Brussels Initials, and placed them in a proposed chronology. However, few of the illuminations can be pinpointed to a specific date, and challenges exist in linking them to each other and to the books in which they appear. The illuminations furthermore appear in books where the decoration was carried out by several different artists. Thus, precise attributions are difficult to make and their chronology has been the subject of debate. Nonetheless, scholars largely agree that several illuminations in a book of hours now in Parma's Biblioteca Palatina (Ms. 159) might be one of the earliest works by the artist, executed around 1390–95. Other works by the Master of the Brussels Initials include illuminations in a book of hours in the Bodleian Library, Oxford (Ms. Douce 62), in the aforementioned Hours of Charles the Noble (in the Cleveland Museum of Art, Cleveland), decorations in a manuscript of Lactantius kept in Holkham Hall, England, and in a book of hours in the library of the Royal Palace, Madrid (Ms. 2099), as well as the initials for which he is named.

There is also broad agreement that the artist brought recent Italian influences to French art. He was influenced by the illuminations of Niccolò da Bologna and hence may have worked in Bologna; and after having spent several years in France he may have returned to Italy later in life. When decorating the initials for which the artist is named, he worked for John, Duke of Berry. The art historian Robert G. Calkins has argued that as time passed, the Master of the Brussels Initials gained increased control over the manufacturing of the manuscripts to which he contributed with illuminations, moving from "simple intrusions" in manuscripts "otherwise totally decorated by indigenous artists" early in his career in France to having free rein when later in his career receiving commissions to finish an abandoned manuscript, in the case of the Brussels Hours.

The Master of the Brussels Initials has been described as "clearly inventive, or at least alert, open-minded and curious" and played an important role in the development of the so-called International Gothic style. Through his work, French manuscript illumination was updated with Italian influences in the form of "brightly coloured miniatures, lively figures, and luminously coloured, fanciful architecture", possibly inspired directly from fresco paintings by Altichiero. The Master of the Brussels Initials was also instrumental in introducing more colourful and lavish border decorations in French manuscript illumination. Meiss notes several iconographic details which were introduced in France from Italy (and a few which were ultimately derived from Byzantine or even Classical models) by the artist but also French influences upon his own art, and does not rule out that the Limbourg brothers, creators of some of the most famous of all medieval books, could have been directly inspired by the works of the Master of the Brussels Initials. This mix of French and Italian traditions, as developed in and around Paris, became characteristic of the International Gothic style during the early 15th century, and the Master of the Brussels Initials played an important role in this milieu.

G. Evelyn Hutchinson has pointed out that among the manuscript decorations attributed to the Master of the Brussels Initials there are also unusually realistic depictions of firebugs, Pyrrhocoris apterus — "certainly by someone who knew the bug in nature" — and depictions of a mutant form of Zygaena ephialtes in certain manuscripts may have been made by another artist after a model or sketch by the Master of the Brussels Initials. He argues that this is an example of a development within manuscript decoration towards a more naturalistic world view, "part of the same movement that produced the contemporary studies of optics and mechanics in England, France and Germany" and which continued with the production of formal natural history treaties in the 16th century.

== Bibliography ==
- Calkins, Robert G. (1981). "An Italian in Paris: The Master of the Brussels Initials and His Participation in the French Book Industry". Gesta. 20 (1): 223–232. doi:10.2307/766845. JSTOR 766845. S2CID 193400556.
- Hutchinson, G. Evelyn (1974). "Marginalia: Aposematic Insects and the Master of the Brussels Initials: The late medieval tradition of the iconography of nature, exemplified in the work of this 15th-century manuscript painter, contributed to the rise of modern biology". American Scientist. 62 (2): 161–171. JSTOR 27844811.
- Meiss, Millard (1989) [1967]. French painting in the time of Jean De Berry : the late Fourteenth century and the patronage of the Duke. Vol. 1 (2 ed.). London: Phaidon Press. OCLC 528886.
- de Winter, Patrick M. (1983). "Bolognese Miniatures at the Cleveland Museum". The Bulletin of the Cleveland Museum of Art. 70 (8): 314–351. JSTOR 25159829.
- Wixom, William D. (1965). "The Hours of Charles the Noble". The Bulletin of the Cleveland Museum of Art. 52 (3): 50–83. JSTOR 25152039.
