= Abbey Bible =

Italian illuminated manuscript

- J. Paul Getty Museum
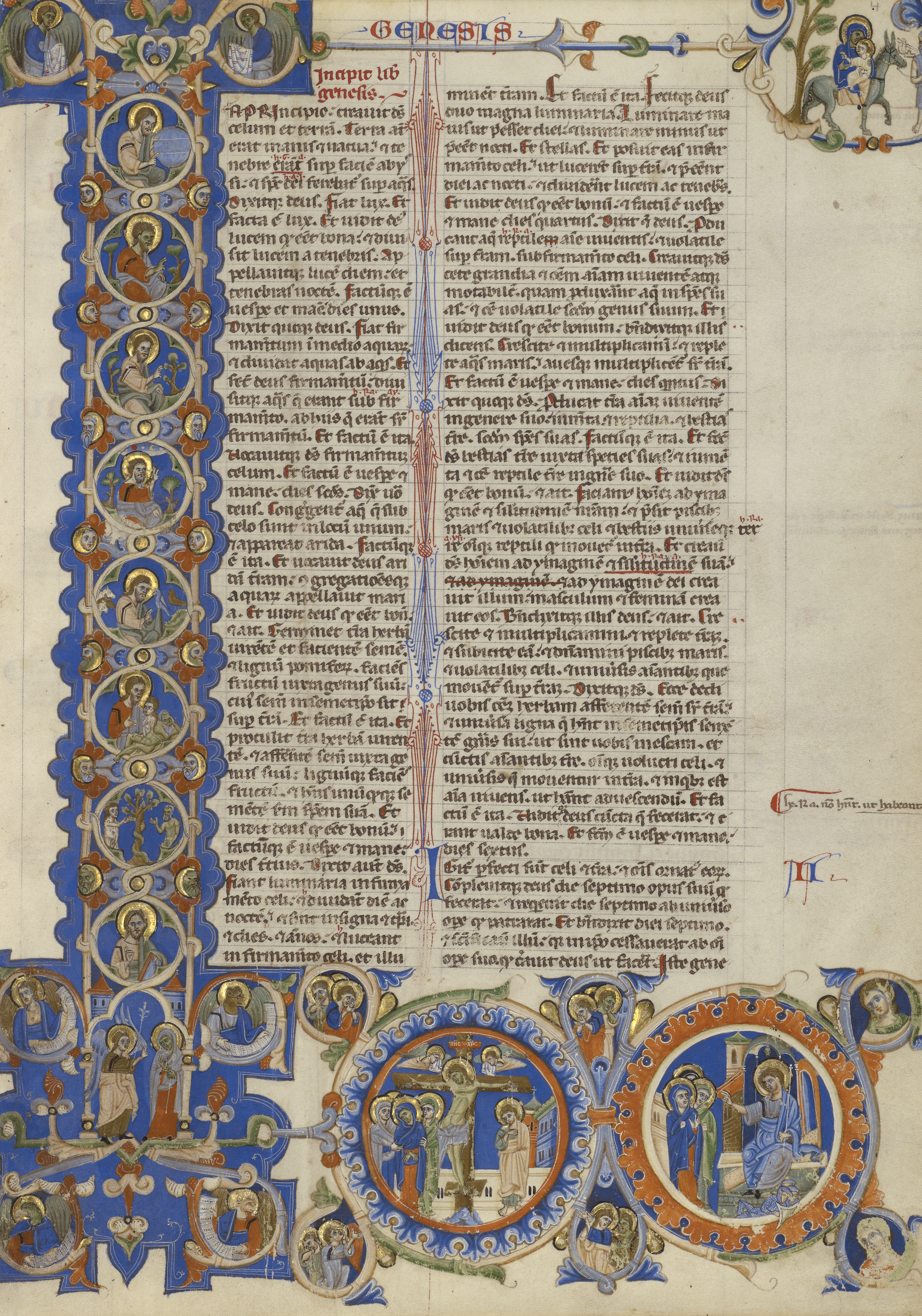
- Scenes of the creation of the world and the life of Christ
- Date: 1250–1262
- Place of origin: Bologna
- Illuminated by: Unknown
- Previously kept: Ascoli Piceno, Major John Roland

The Abbey Bible is a complex illuminated manuscript, created in Bologna, Italy in the mid-thirteenth century. It is an example of a Gothic-style Bible, with significant Byzantine influence. This manuscript is especially known for its distinctive marginal imagery. The Abbey Bible is now in the J. Paul Getty Museum in Malibu, California.

== History ==
=== Origin ===
Also known as MS.107, or 2011.23, the Abbey Bible is a single-volume Bible, with intricate imagery and marginal commentaries. Although the Bible was the principal textbook for students during the mid-thirteenth and fourteenth centuries, this is a "luxury" manuscript for the altar, rather than study. All evidence suggests that it was created for a Dominican monastery at the cathedral at Ascoli Piceno, in Italy. During this time, Bologna was an important center for the creation of Gothic illuminated Bibles. The Abbey Bible is one of the most prestigious examples of an illuminated manuscript produced in Northern Italy, and highlights the Byzantine style influences.

=== Historical context ===
In the year 1216, Dominic of Caleruega founded the Order of Friars Preachers, also known as the Dominicans. The Abbey Bible was made for Dominicans at the cathedral of Ascoli Piceno. In the pages of the Abbey Bible, it is clear that the Dominican Order was engaged in a fierce competition and clash of ideals with the Franciscans Order, as they both grew to power during the late medieval period in Italy. One clear example of this is found on folio 224r, Initial C: The Nativity where both the Dominican and Franciscan monks are depicted singing at opposing lecterns, with the Dominicans being the receivers of favor and blessings from God. In contrast with other Franciscan illuminations made during this time, which often featured images of St. Francis of Assisi, the Abbey Bible never emphasizes a significant role to the saint associated with the Order's creation, Saint Dominic, despite the ornate nature of this particular Bible.

=== Provenance ===
Based on the overall elegance of the Abbey Bible, and the plethora of rich colors and gold-leafing, as well as a calendar which is present on the last pages, it is believed to have been commissioned for or gifted to a Dominican monastery. The Abbey Bible has switched hands nearly seven times over its lifetime.

The Abbey Bible is now in the J. Paul Getty Museum in Los Angeles, CA, after being purchased in 1989. It is currently unavailable to view in person at the museum. However, several pages of this illuminated manuscript are available for free downloading and viewing online, at the J. Paul Getty Museum website.

== Description ==
The Abbey Bible was illuminated in Bologna, Italy around 1250–62. The illuminated manuscript consists of text, illustrations, and distinctly unique marginalia. It is made of tempera coloring, gold leaf and ink on parchment, and the pages are not much smaller than modern, standard letter-sized paper. Despite the lively penmanship and expressive figures throughout the Abbey Bible, its intended purpose was for scholarly research.

=== Text ===
The Abbey Bible is full of historiated initials at the start of each passage. It also contains several examples of edits and modifications, which leads art historians to conclude that the manuscript has a university origin.

==== Calendar pages ====
Calendar pages, Easter tables and tables of readings are also included in the last folios of this manuscript. Unlike the other pages of the Abbey Bible, these pages do not include illuminations of figures. Their purpose is simply to record dates and information clearly, in an organized fashion for documentation and reference only.

=== Illuminations ===
The illuminations contained within the Abbey Bible are delicate and exacting in their detail. The facial expressions are quite elaborate, and thus unique to this manuscript. There is also expert use of interlace, as well as striking design and compositions throughout. The makers of the Abbey Bible were talented calligraphers and storytellers. The Abbey Bible opens with the first few pages depicting the life of Christ, as well as the saints to whom the manuscript is dedicated. Beginning on the fourth page, we get the first glimpse of the Book of Genesis: Initial I: Scenes of the Creation of the World and the Life of Christ. This folio delivers a dramatically detailed account of the creation story, and imagery that solidifies Christ's role as Lord and Savior. It contains some of the most elaborate illuminations of the Abbey Bible as a whole. In the bottom lefthand corner of this folio, illuminations of what appear to be an angel, a lion, and ox and an eagle are also present; these are visual representations of the Four Evangelists, Matthew, Mark, Luke and John.

==== Marginalia ====
The hand-crafted marginalia that decorate the entirety of the Abbey Bible are distinctive because they depict the rival friars side by side, unlike any other manuscript of its time. It was vital to the shared values of these two orders to be represented in these pages and in the marginalia.

==== Monsters ====
People living during the medieval period believed that monsters lived in the outer limits of the world, far away from the human race. Monstrous races are exhibited in the Abbey Bible throughout the illuminations as a part of its storytelling method. A prime example of this is seen on folio 121, Initial E: Abishag before David on His Deathbed; at the foot of the page, there are two unidentifiable monsters dangling by their mouths from the historiated initial and interlaced imagery and gold leaf.

==== Bas-de-page scenes ====
Bas-de-page scenes can be described as those having unframed imagery near the foot or bottom of the illuminated manuscript pages, typically in the Gothic style. It is possible that this imagery is relevant and reflecting the text on the same page, but it is also possible it is irrelevant. An example of this is seen in the gallery image titled: Initial H: Moses Striking Water from the Rock and Israelites Drawing Water.

== Gallery ==
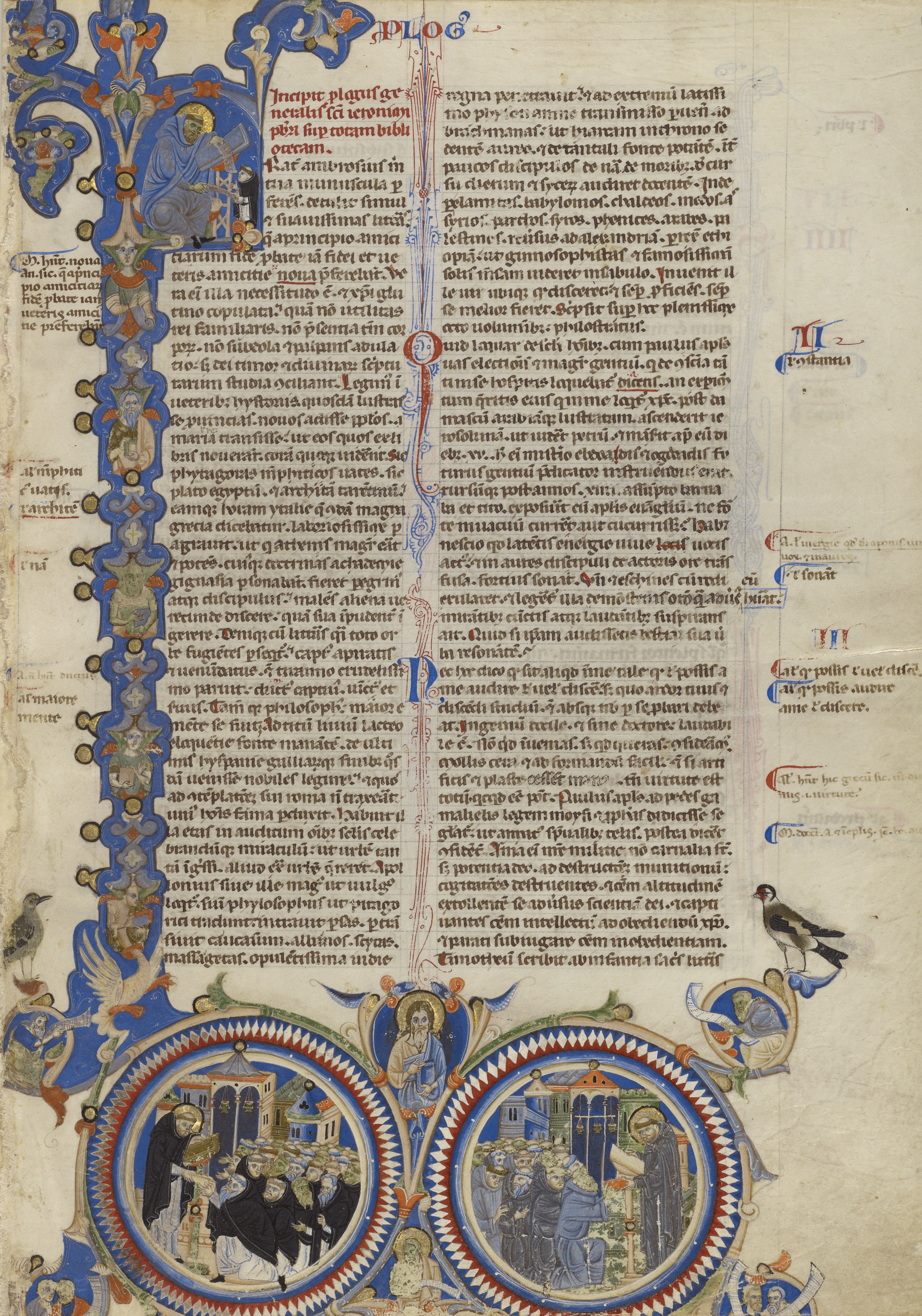
Initial I: Scenes of the Creation of the World and the Life of Christ, Italian, about 1250–1262, fol. 4

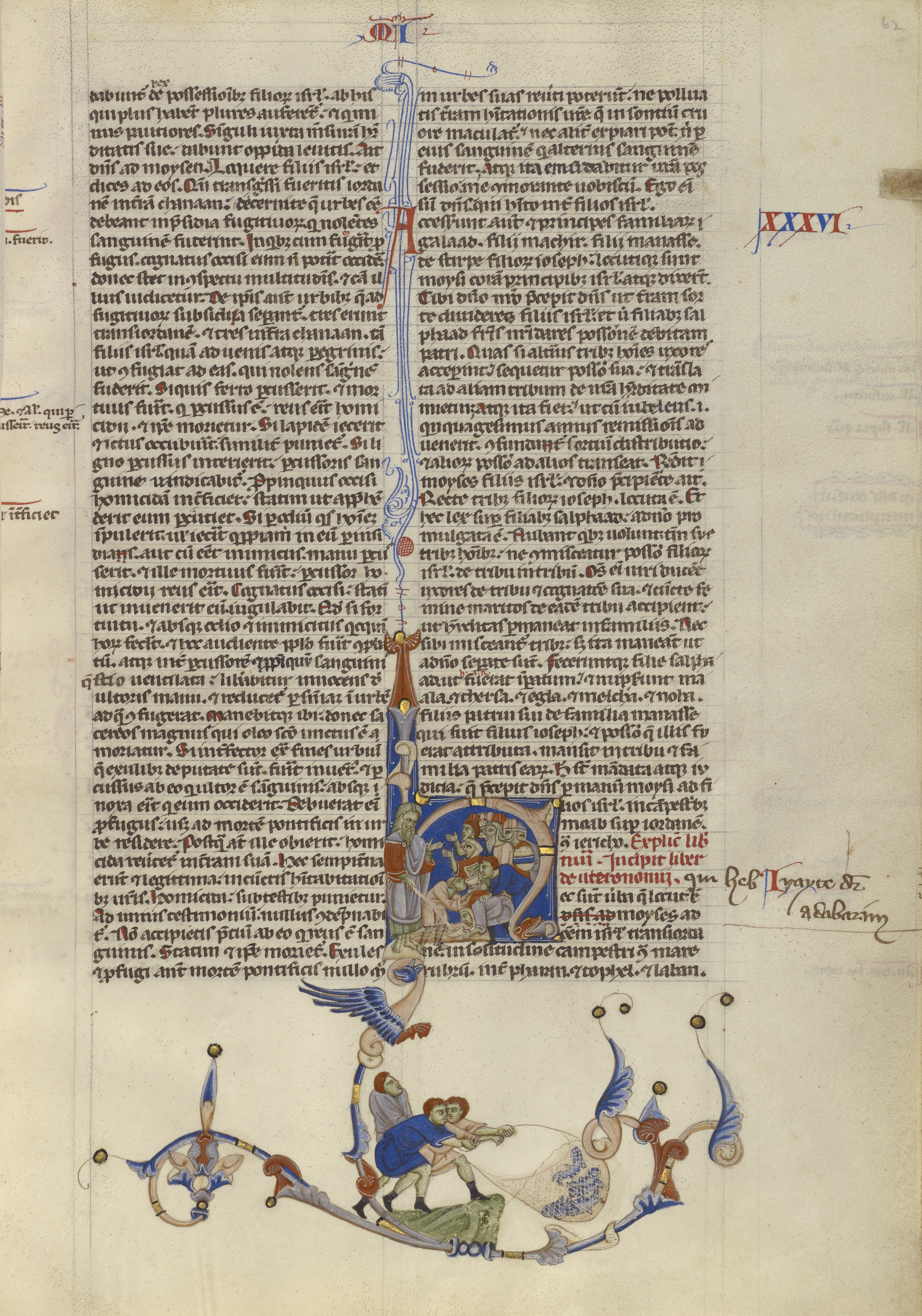
Initial H: Moses Striking Water from the Rock and Israelites Drawing Water, Italian, about 1250–1262, fol. 62

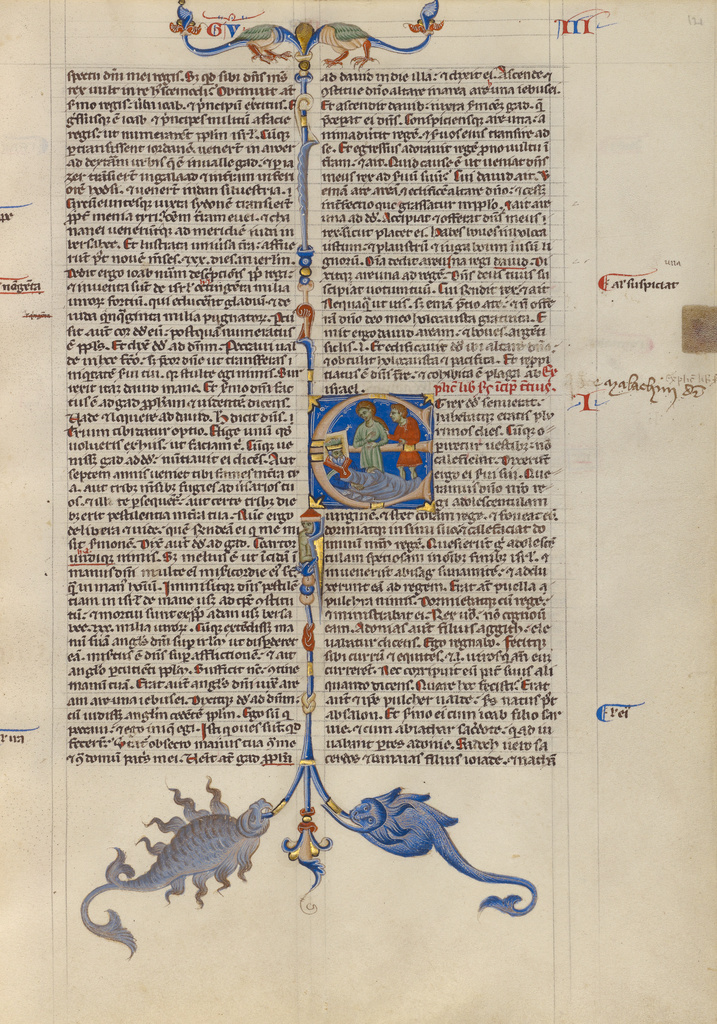
Initial E, Abishag before David on His Deathbed, Italian, about 1250–1262, fol. 121

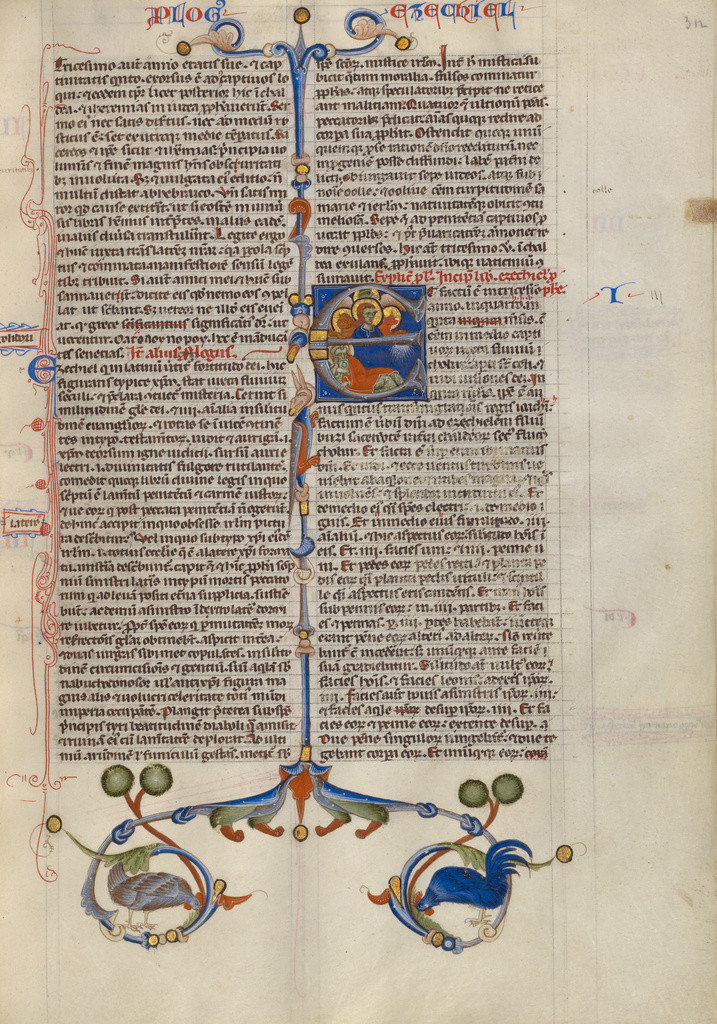
Initial E, Ezekiel Dreaming of the Four Evangelist Symbols, Italian, about 1250–1262, fol. 312

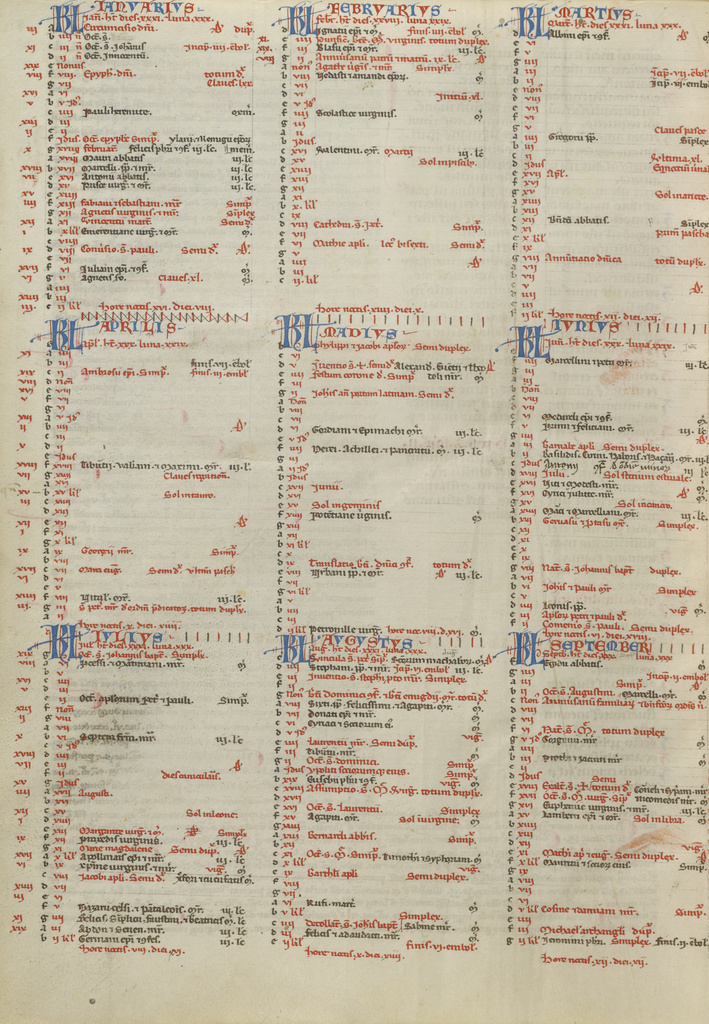
Calendar Page, Italian, about 1250–1262, fol. 512v

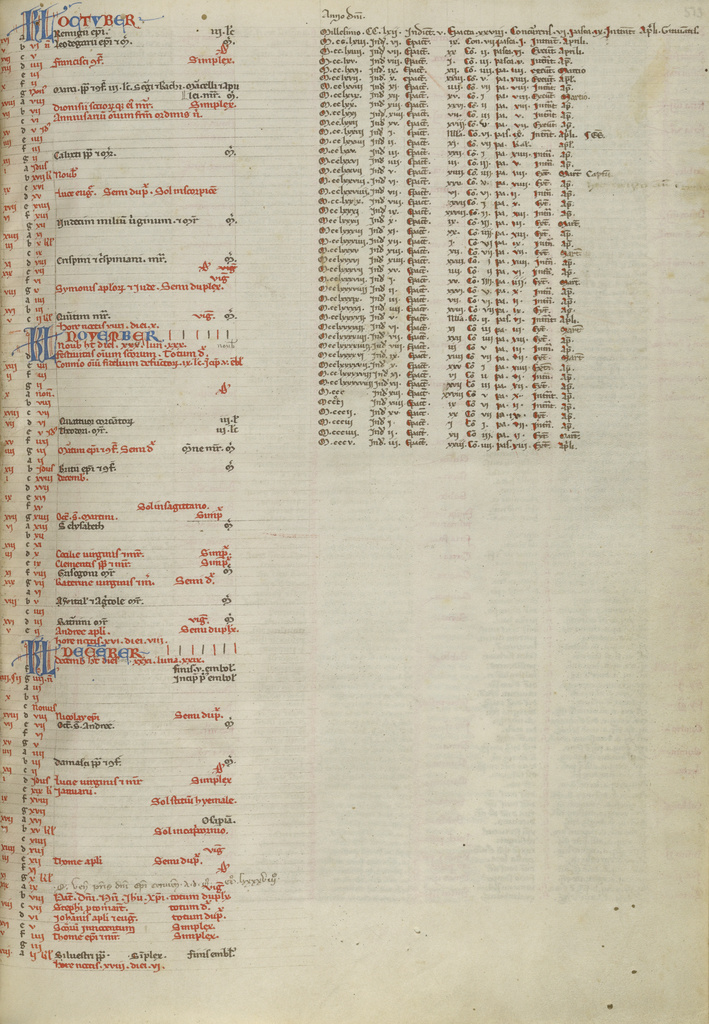
Calendar Page and Easter Table, Italian, about 1250–1262, fol. 513
