= Smithfield Decretals =

Medieval manuscript

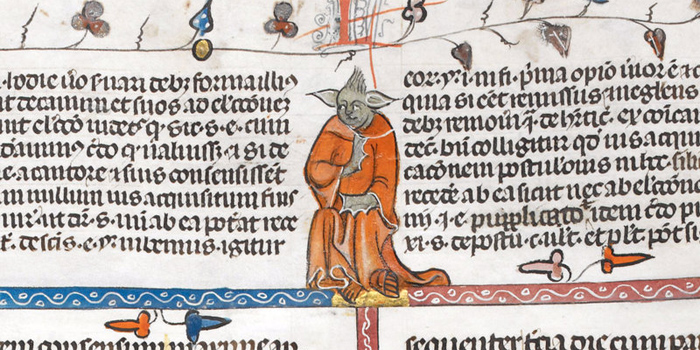

The Smithfield Decretals is a fourteenth century manuscript which contains 1,971 documents recording the Decretals of Gregory IX. This particular copy of these decretals is known for its marginal illustrations which are drolleries unrelated to the texts but instead picture other fables, fancies and stories. The manuscript is now in the British Library which has digitised it.
