= Hours of Charles the Noble =

Illuminated manuscript made in 15th-century Paris

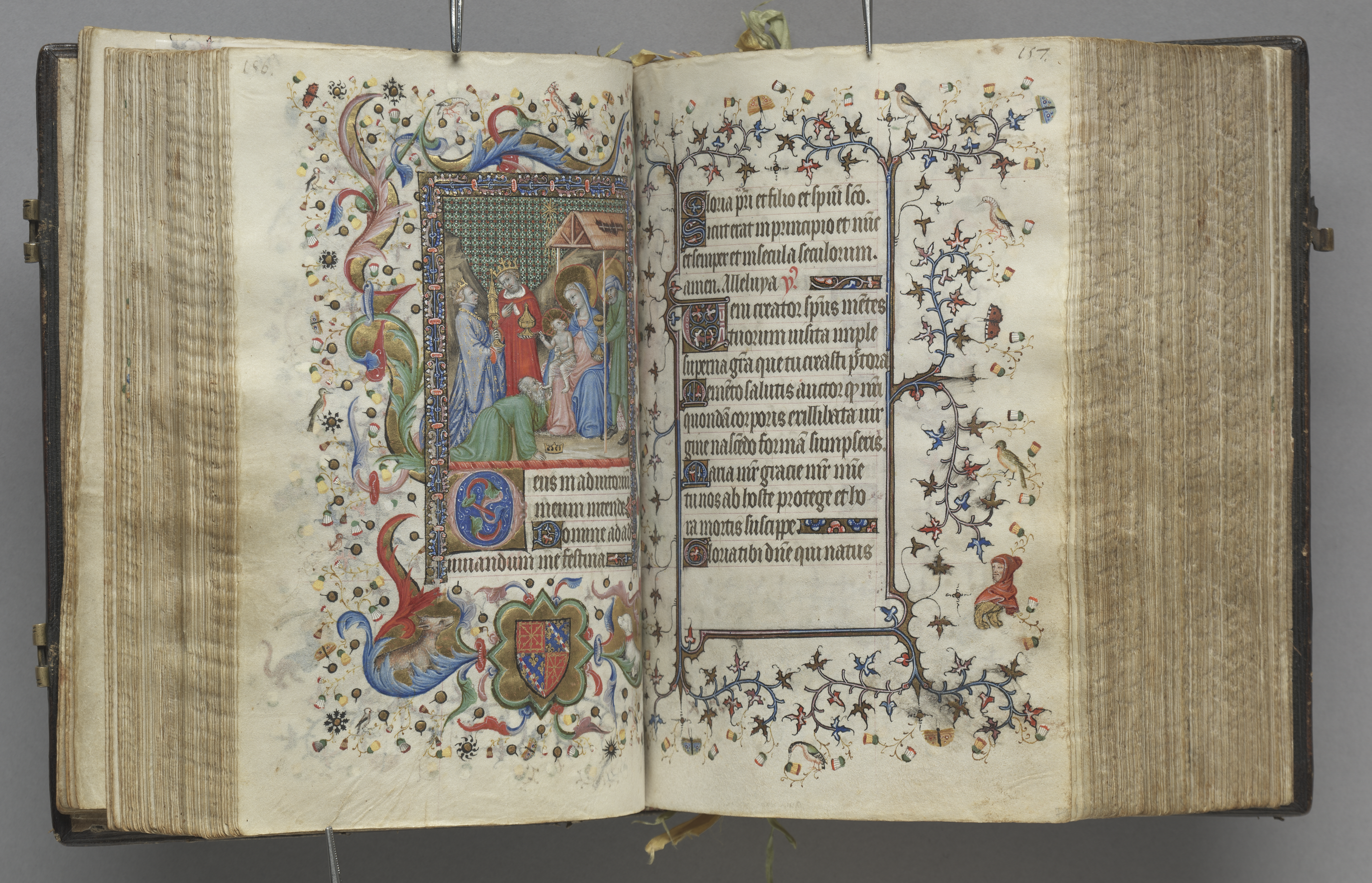
The Hours of Charles the Noble

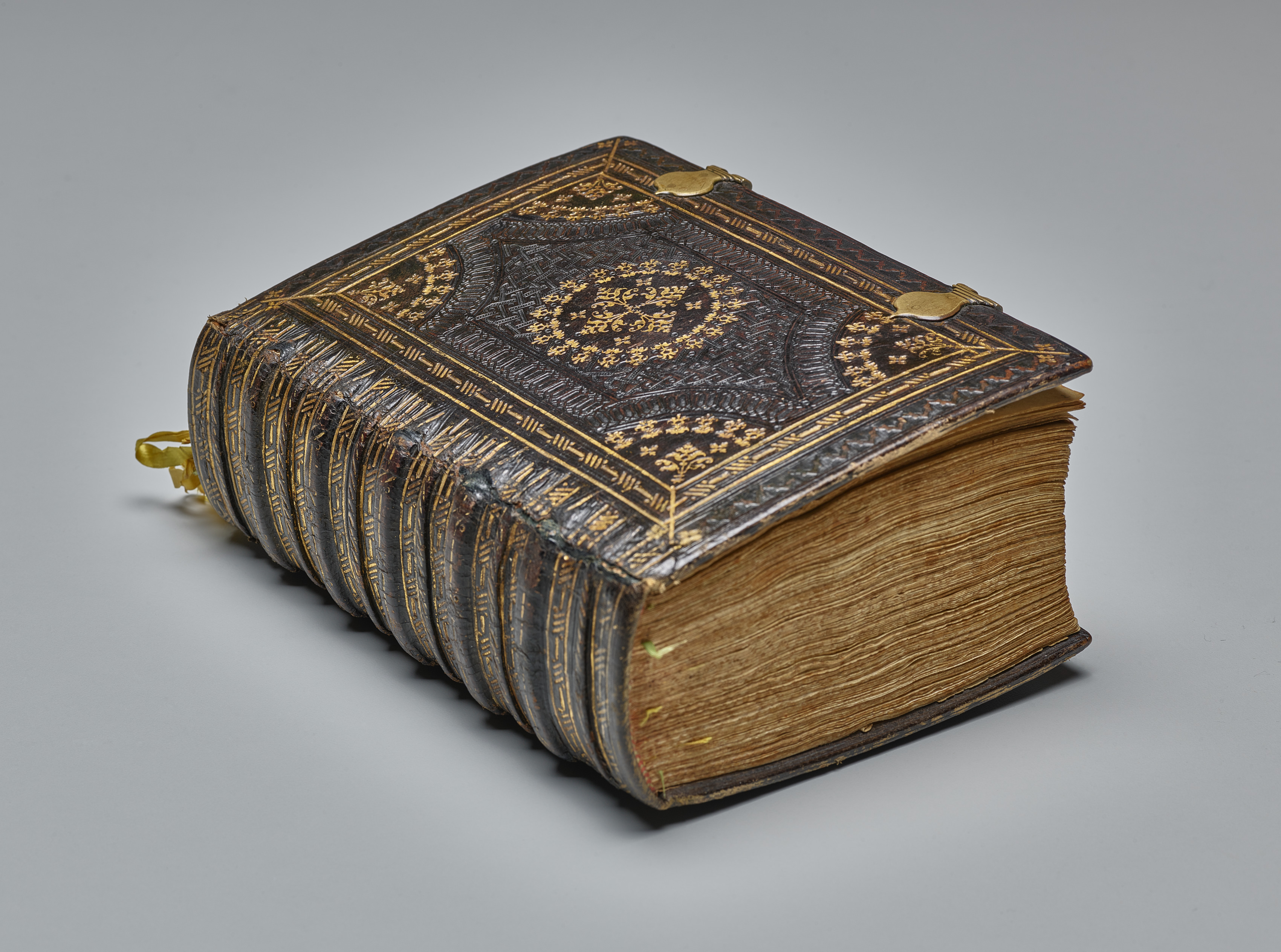
Book closed

The Hours of Charles the Noble (French: Heures de Charles le Noble) is a book of hours made in Paris in the early 15th century, and bought by Charles III of Navarre, called "the Noble", in 1404 or 1408. Since 1964 it has been in the collection of the Cleveland Museum of Art in Cleveland, Ohio, United States. It was decorated by an international team of illuminators and illustrators of at least six people, headed by the so-called Master of the Brussels Initials. It was probably bought ready-made by Charles, who later had his coat of arms added to it in several places.

The main artist of the book was the Master of the Brussels Initials; five of the large illuminations were in addition made by the so-called Egerton Master. The artistic programme of the book is a conscious fusion of Italian and French artistic influences, and it is important in that it helped pave the way for the so-called International Gothic of the early 15th century, and later highlights of medieval book illumination such as that by the Limbourg brothers. The book is profusely decorated, its marginal decoration alone was probably the richest produced in France for almost a century. Among its many smaller decorations are for example also depictions of 180 medieval musical instruments, probably more than in any other surviving book of hours.

== History ==
The book was probably purchased by Charles III of Navarre from a bookseller in Paris in 1404 or 1408. It has been proposed that Charles bought it while in Paris in the summer of 1404, since he would at that time have received a lot of cash from selling his claims to the County of Évreux. It appears to have been sold ready-made from the stock of the bookseller, with only the coat of arms of Charles added afterwards; a similar book of hours now in the British Library and probably from the same trader, appears to have remained unsold and contains blank spaces for the insertion of the coat of arms of a prospective buyer. Charles was supposedly fond of books, of which he had many, and the book of hours was probably kept at his library at the Palace of the Kings of Navarre of Olite. It is bound in a 16th-century Spanish binding. In the 19th century, the book was in the possession of Edmond James de Rothschild, whose son Maurice de Rothschild and later grandson Edmond Adolphe de Rothschild inherited it. It was purchased by Cleveland Museum of Art in 1964.

== Description ==
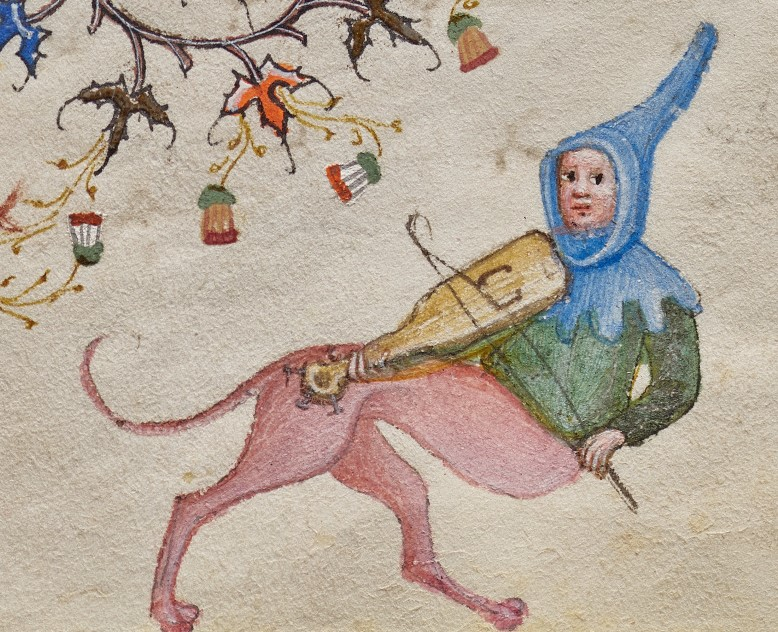
A left-handed half-man, half-beast playing the vielle, detail of one of the margins

The book is 200 millimetres (7.9 in) by 140 millimetres (5.5 in) — "about the height and width of a modern paperback novel" — and contains 334 leaves, with pages numbered 1–668. The text is written in brown, red, blue and gold ink, and the illustrations made with tempera and burnished gold. The layout and illustrations of the book follow the pattern of other books of hours from Paris. At least six different artists provided illustrations and decorations. The main artist was the so-called Master of the Brussels Initials, a notname for an Italian artist who worked in Paris during the early 15th century. The majority of the large illustrations were made by the Master of the Brussels Initials. Five half-page miniatures were also made by the Netherlandish artist known as the Egerton Master, while the other four artists — another Italian, another Netherlandish and two French — provided much of the other decoration.

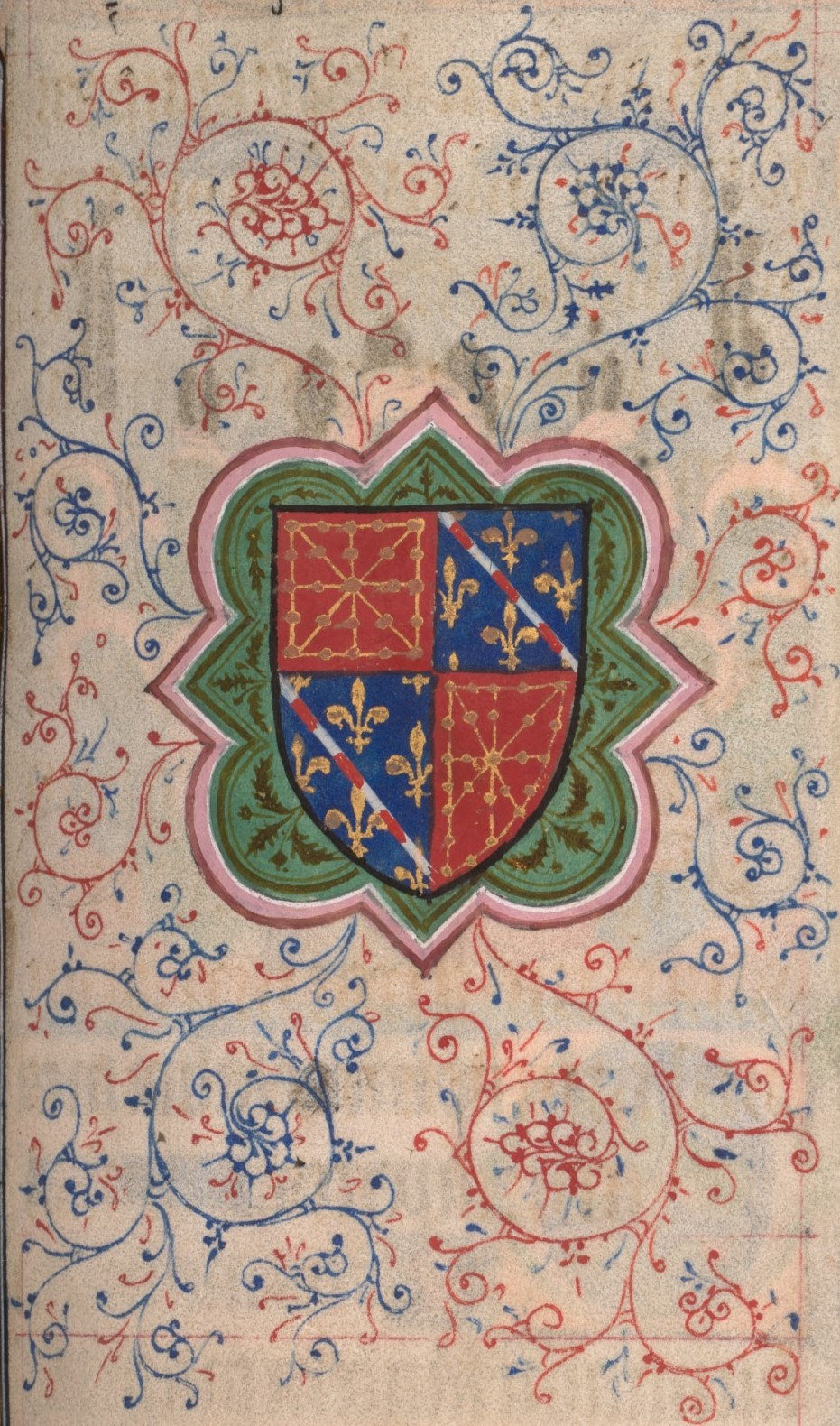
Detail of fol. 137r of the Hours of Charles the Noble, showing the coat of arms of Charles the Noble

The miniatures and other decoration made by the Master of the Brussels Initials in the Hours of Charles the Noble testify to the artist's "open-mindedness and delight in variety" and consciously fuses Italian, particularly Bolognese stylistic influences with French stylistic elements. His illuminations are characterised by subtle use of colour, well-composed spaces and interiors, and occasionally expressive facial features. By fusing Italian and French elements, the Master of the Brussels Initials played an important part in the development of the so-called International Gothic style of the early 15th century. The Limbourg brothers, who would create some of the most well-known illuminated manuscripts somewhat later, were to some degree perhaps influenced by miniatures in the Hours of Charles the Noble. The book has therefore been described as "not only an intrinsically beautiful object but also an important document in the development of painting in the environs of Paris in the first decade after 1400". The five miniatures by the Egerton Master were also conceived within this context, and a development in style from the first to the later of the miniatures has been pointed out. They are characterised by expressive use of colour and space, and "incisive, psychological expression" in the figures depicted. He also was among the first to depict distant landscapes in an atmospheric, expressive way.

Apart from the main illustrations, the book also contains the coat of arms of Charles the Noble, painted underneath each of the half-page miniatures as well as on a page which in its entirety (fol. 137r). The margins are profusely decorated with drolleries, many apparently nonsensical and parodic, while some may contain popular references, e.g. to the story of Reynard the Fox. They include foxes, cats, hares, birds and insects, but also imaginary beasts. A striking number of the figures, 104 in total, are depicted reading or engaged somehow with books. A further 180 small images in the margins of the book depict medieval musical instruments, probably more than in any other surviving book of hours and incidentally providing a representative overview of medieval musical instruments. When it comes to decorated margins, it has been proposed that no other French book had been so lavishly made for about a century.

== Bibliography ==
- Duffin, Ross W. (1997). "Backward Bells and Barrel Bells: Notes on the History of Loud Wind Instruments" (PDF). Historic Brass Society Journal. 9: 113–129.
- Meiss, Millard (1989) [1967]. French painting in the time of Jean De Berry : the late Fourteenth century and the patronage of the Duke. Vol. 1 (2 ed.). London: Phaidon Press. OCLC 528886.
- de Winter, Patrick M. (1983). "Bolognese Miniatures at the Cleveland Museum". The Bulletin of the Cleveland Museum of Art. 70 (8): 314–351. JSTOR 25159829.
- Winternitz, Emanuel (1965). "The Hours of Charles the Noble: Musicians and Musical Instruments". The Bulletin of the Cleveland Museum of Art. 52 (3): 84–91. JSTOR 25152040.
- Wixom, William D. (1964). "Twelve Masterpieces of Medieval and Renaissance Book Illumination. A Catalogue to the Exhibition: March 17-May 17, 1964". The Bulletin of the Cleveland Museum of Art. 51 (3): 43–63. JSTOR 25151989.
- Wixom, William D. (1965). "The Hours of Charles the Noble". The Bulletin of the Cleveland Museum of Art. 52 (3): 50–83. JSTOR 25152039.
- Wixom, William D. (1966). "The Hours of Charles the Noble (Cleveland Museum of Art)". The Burlington Magazine. 108 (760): 367–368+370+373. JSTOR 875022.
