= Lombardic capitals =

Type of decorative capital letter

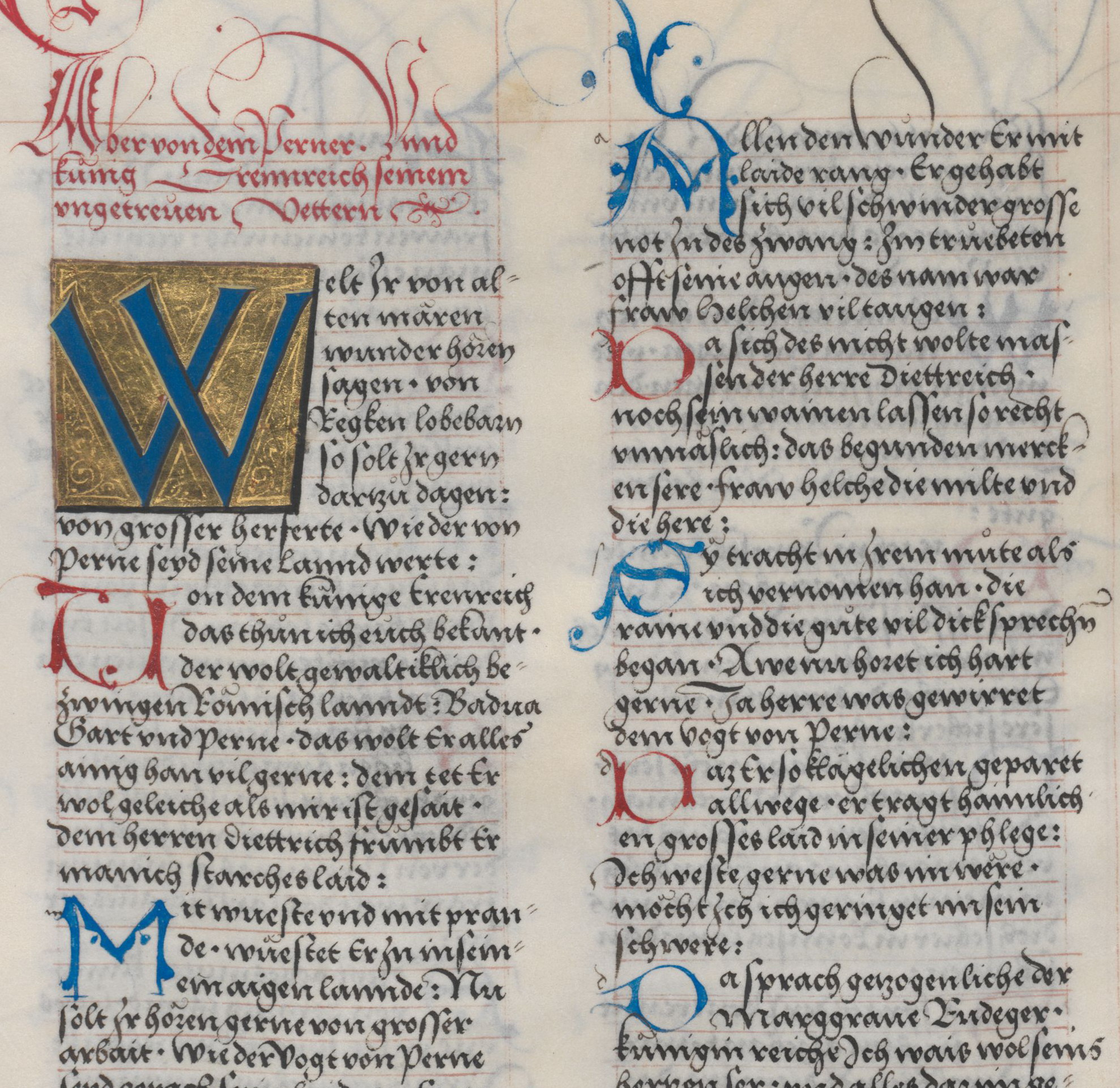
Lombardic capitals in a manuscript (the Ambraser Heldenbuch, fol. 75v, c. 1516)

Lombardic capitals is the name given to a type of decorative uppercase letter used in inscriptions and, typically, at the start of a section of text in medieval manuscripts. They are characterized by their rounded forms with thick, curved stems. Paul Shaw describes the style as a "relative" of uncial writing.

Unlike Gothic capitals, Lombardic capitals were also used to write words or entire phrases. They were used both in illuminated manuscripts and monumental inscriptions, like the bell tower of Santa Chiara, Naples. In Italian, the style is known as "Longobarda" after an earlier spelling of Lombardy (Longobardia).

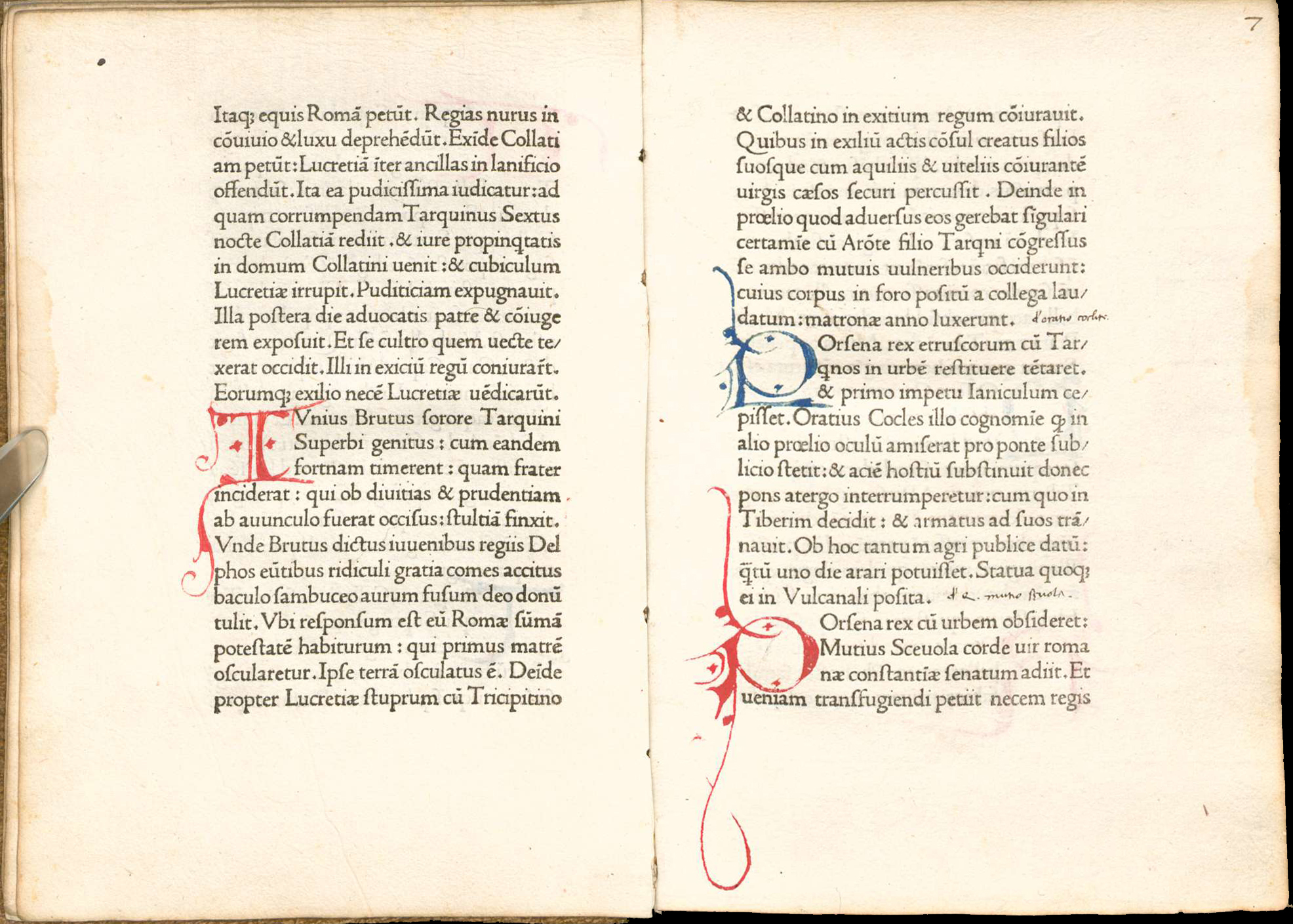
Lombardic capitals in an early printed book (Cicero's De viris illustribus, Nicolas Jenson c. 1470)

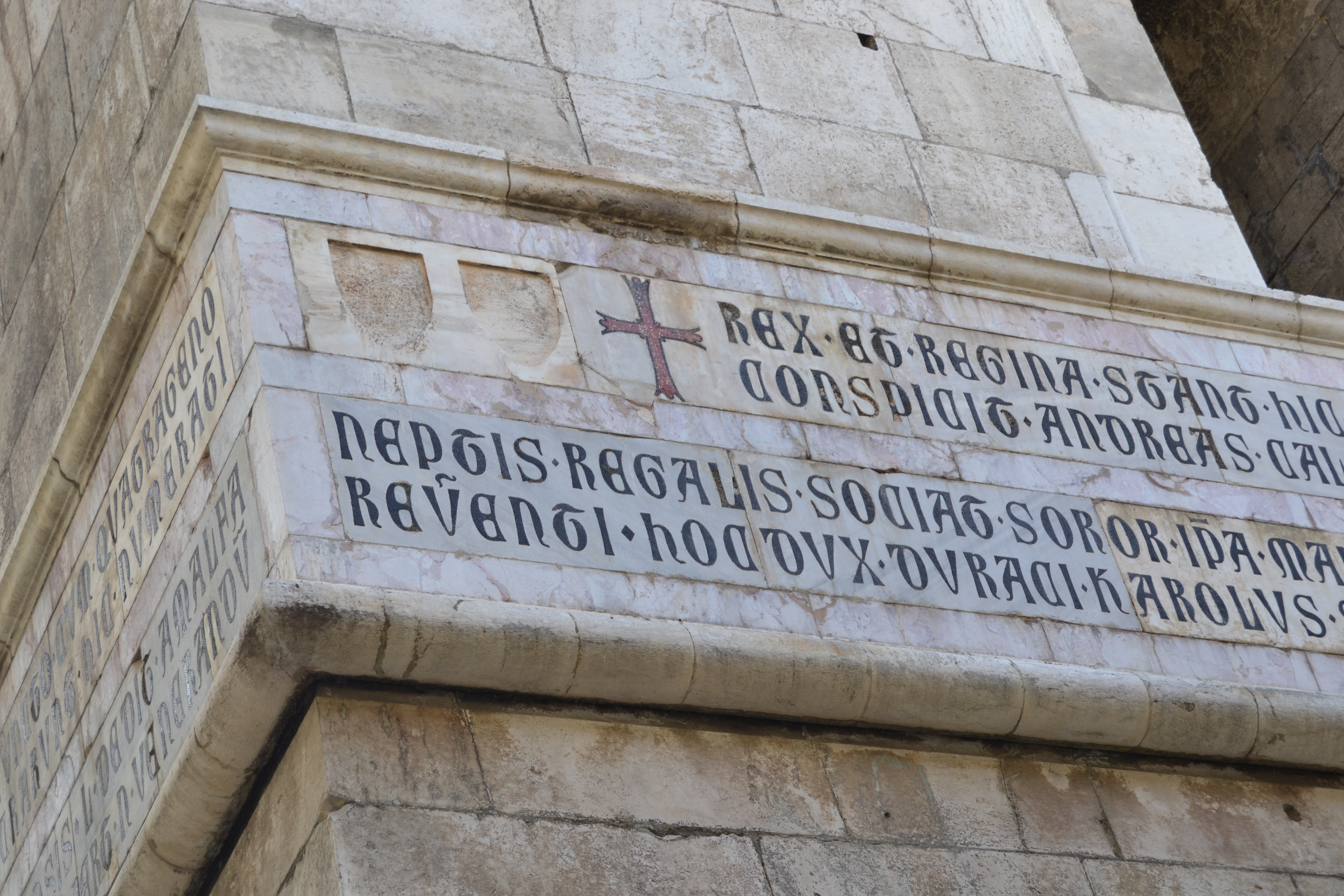
Inscription in Lombardic Capitals on the campanile of Santa Chiara, Naples

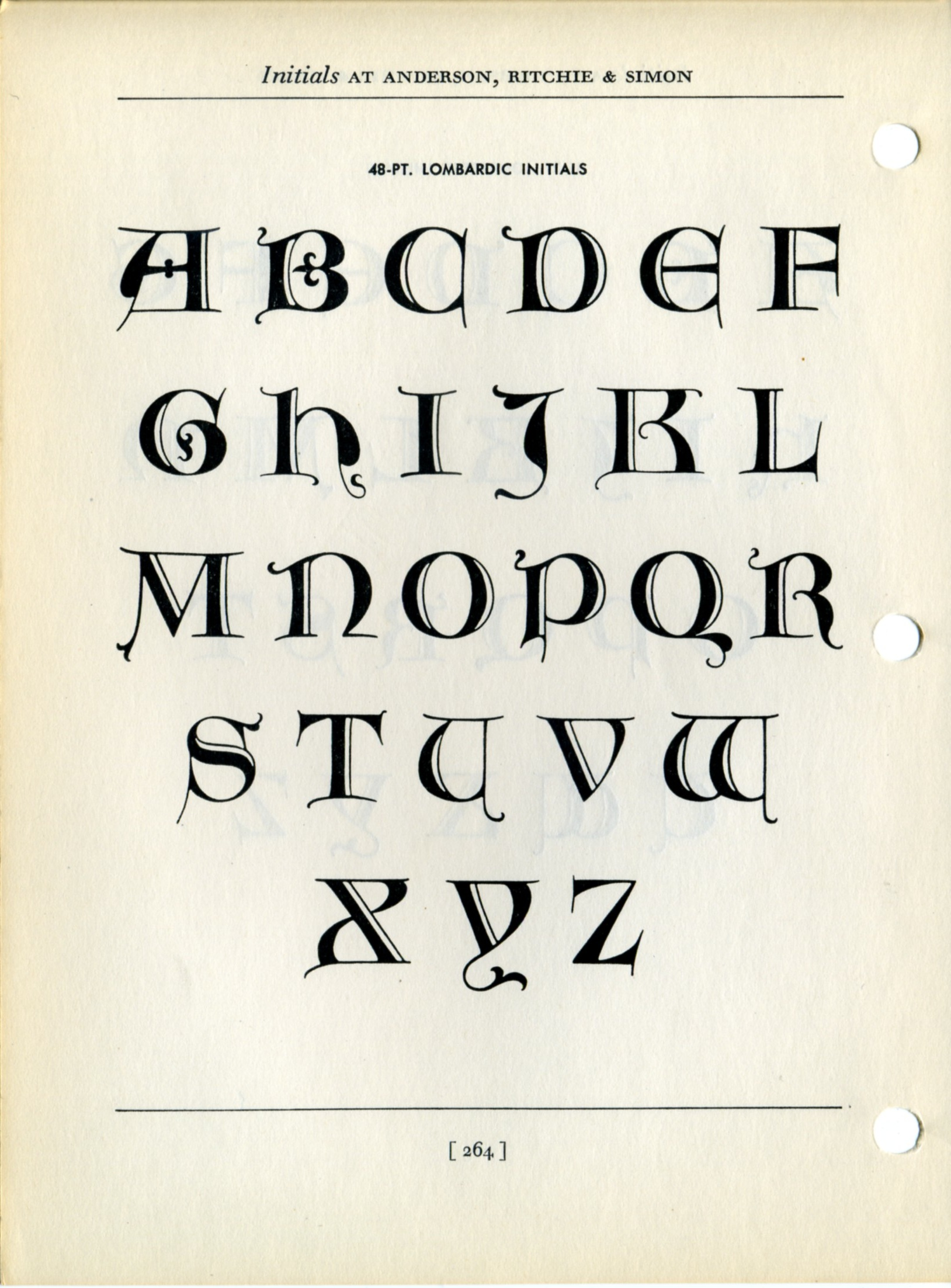
Frederic Goudy's Lombardic Capitals, metal type

== History ==
The term Lombardic comes from the study of incunabula. A characteristic form of text decoration in manuscripts and early printed books with hand colouring was to use alternating red and blue Lombardic capitals for the start of each successive paragraph. Unlike historiated or inhabited initials, Lombardic capitals are devoid of further decoration.

In modern times, fonts of Lombardic capitals have been designed by many typographers, such as Frederic Goudy, who included a set as an alternative uppercase for his Goudy Text font.

First, Lombardic, or the national hand of Italy, which was a development of the uncial and was first used in northern Italy. The Lombardic character is a most useful and interesting form and presents less of the fixed quality of the Roman. There are many and wide variations of it as developed by the scribes in different countries. It was the favorite form selected for initials and versals in manuscripts, which were usually painted in, in colors and gold, the solidity of the bodystrokes making it especially adaptable for this purpose. At its best this Lombardic letter preserves much of the feeling of the uncials of the sixth and seventh centuries.

— Frederic Goudy

== See also ==
- Historiated initial
- Inhabited initial
