= Hamilton Field Book of Hours =

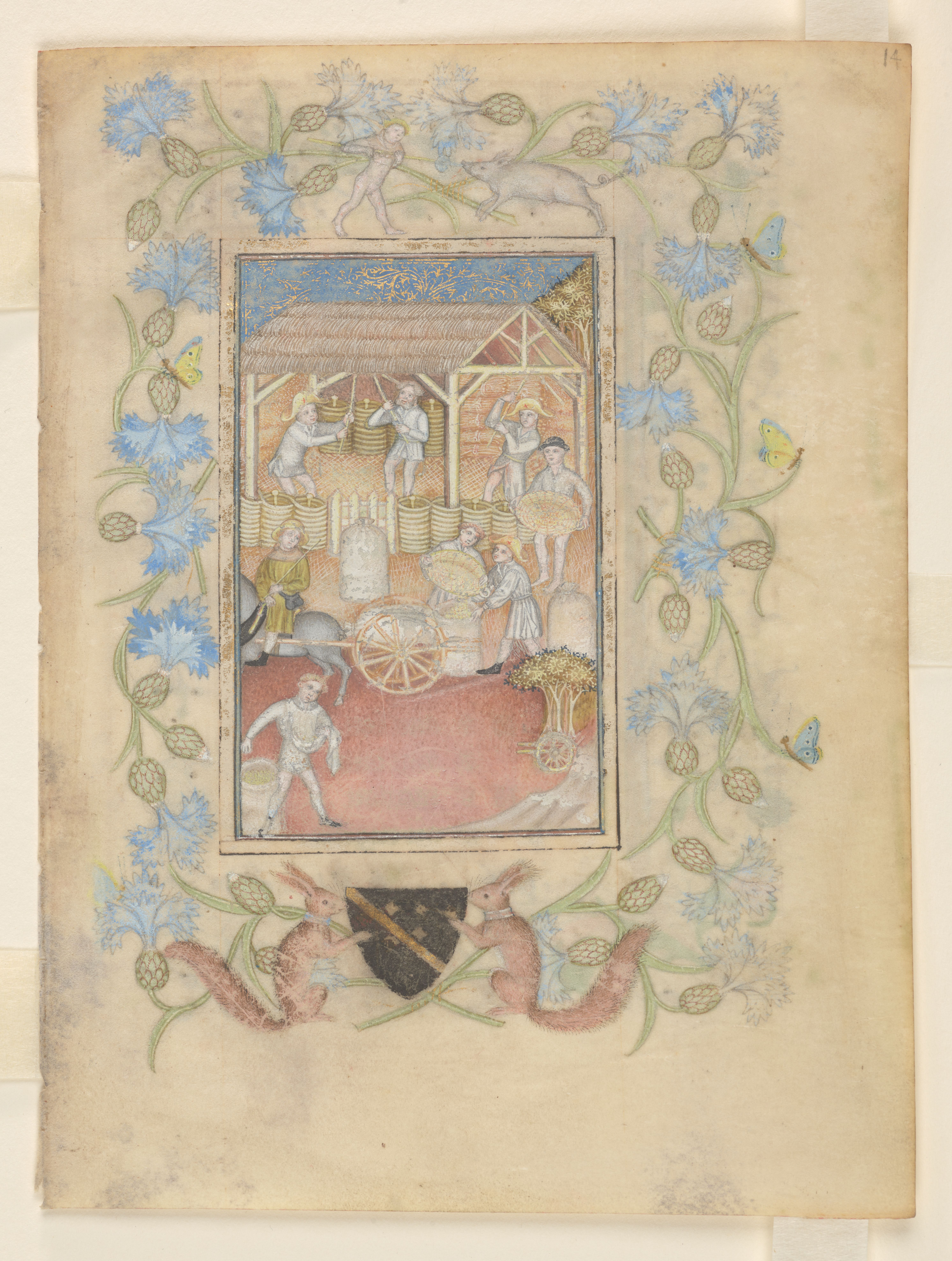
Full-page miniature from the calendar of the Hamilton Field Book of Hour, with characteristically broad margins, decorated with flowers and wildlife.

The Hamilton Field Book of Hours is a book of hours, a medieval illuminated manuscript, currently kept in the Chester Beatty Library in Dublin, Ireland. It was made by an artist known by the notname of Master of Walters 219.

== History ==
The book was produced sometime between 1412 and 1420, probably in Paris. The artist responsible for the decoration was the so-called Master of Walters 219. The book appears to have been made for a member of the Contet family in the French province of Champagne, judging from the fact that the family's coat of arms appears throughout the book. The book derives its name from a previous owner, American artist and collector Hamilton Easter Field. It was bought by Alfred Chester Beatty in 1927 and is today part of the collections of the Chester Beatty Library in Dublin, Ireland.

== Description ==
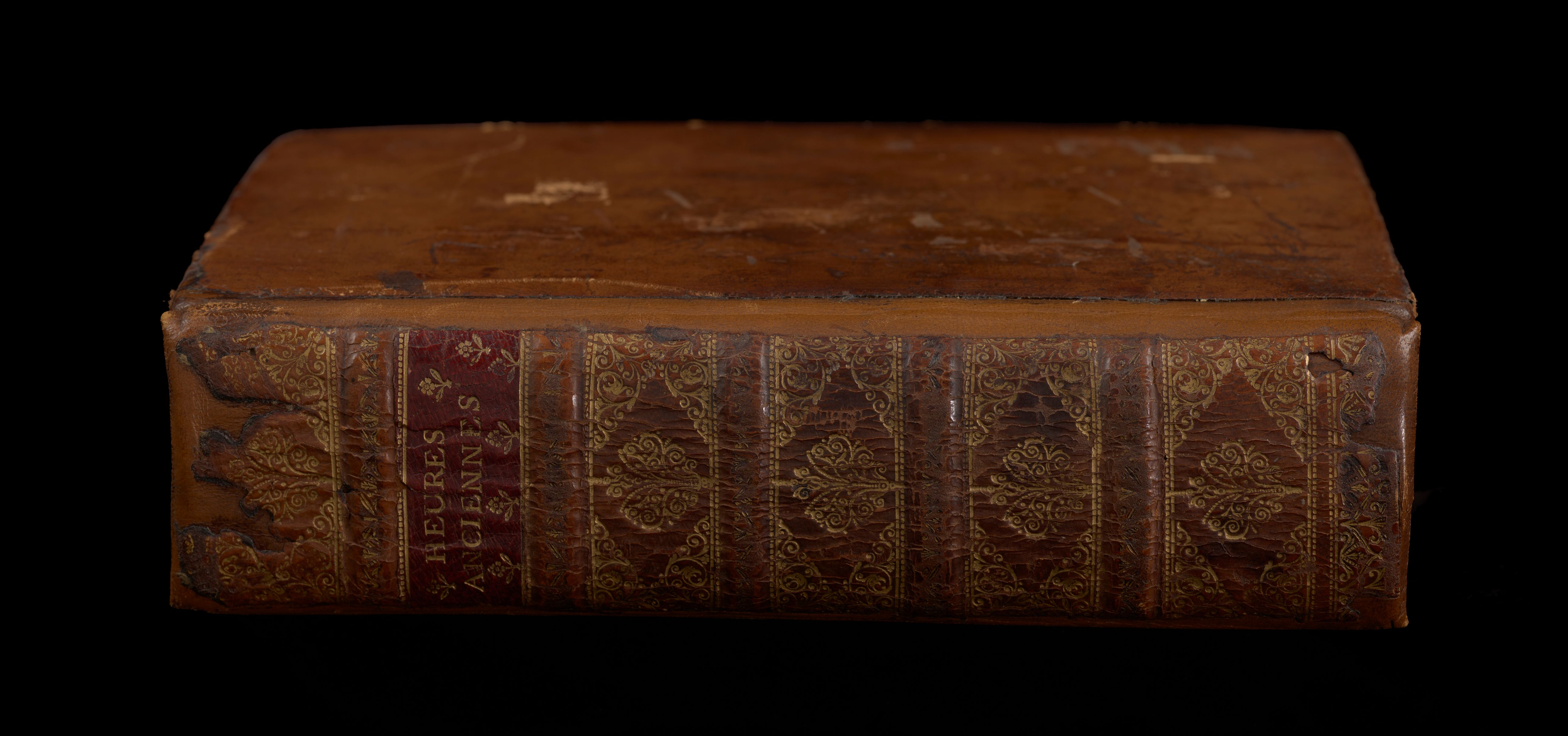
The 18th-century binding

The book displays an original and progressive style in comparison with other books of hours from the same time, particularly in the calendar which is clearly inspired by the Très Riches Heures du Duc de Berry by the Limbourg brothers. The book also has the broad margins decorated with unusually naturalistic depictions of flowers and wildlife typical for the artist. It is one of few French books of hours from the period that contains fully developed depictions of landscapes. The style is influenced by Italian Trecento painting.

The book measures 205 millimetres (8.1 in) by 155 millimetres (6.1 in) and contains a total of 19 miniatures. Its current binding is from the 18th century. The lettering is Gothic, written in brown and red ink. The material of the leaves is parchment.
