= Drollery =

Decorative image in the margin of an illuminated manuscript

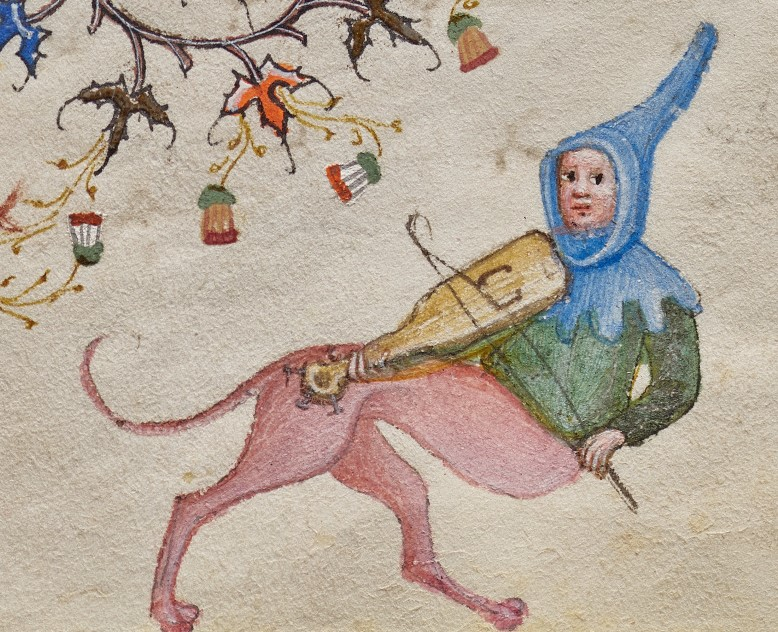
Drollery detail from the Hours of Charles the Noble

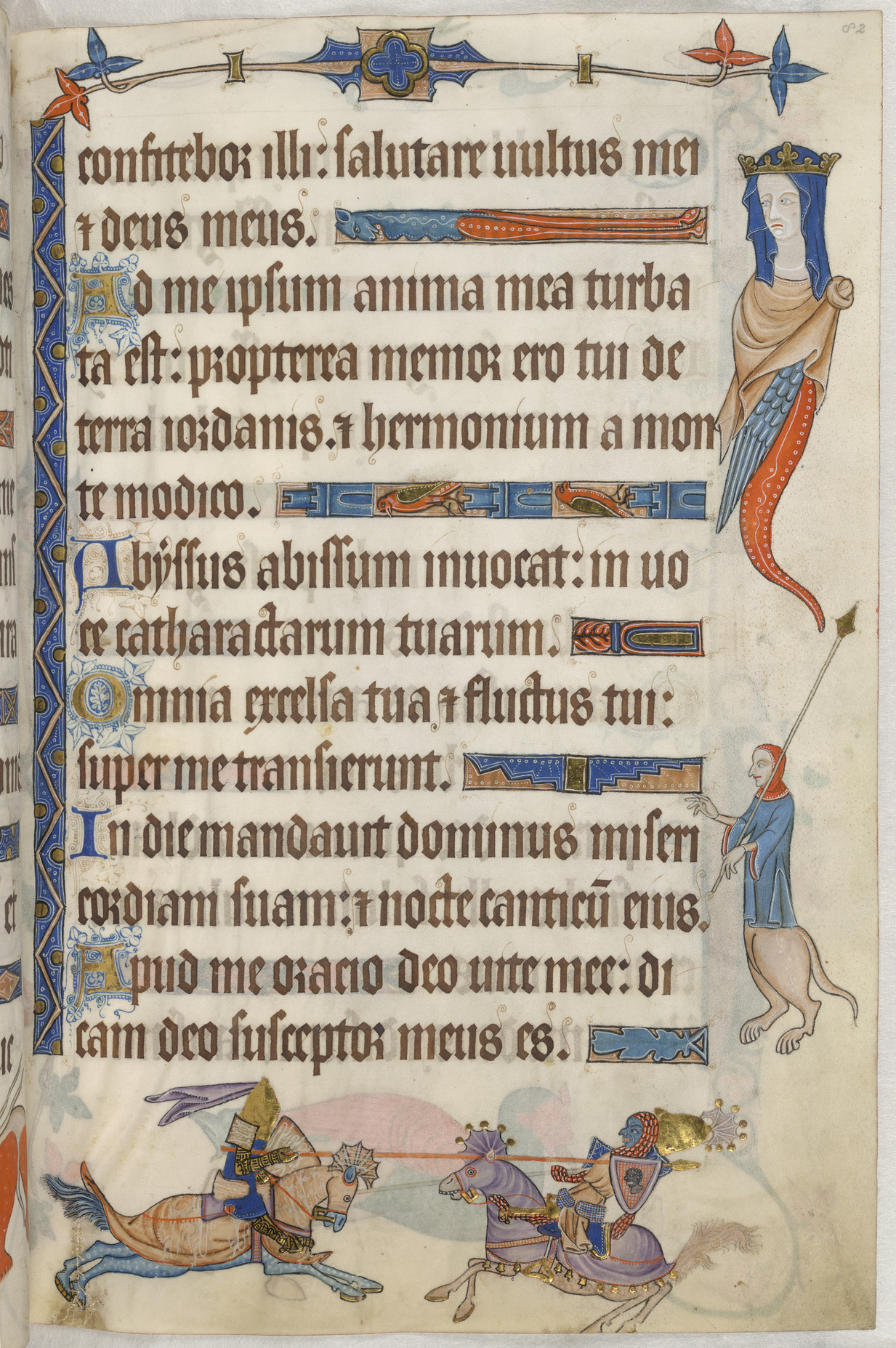
Page from the 14th-century Luttrell Psalter, showing two drolleries in the right margin.

A drollery, often also called a grotesque, is a small decorative image in the margin of an illuminated manuscript, most popular from about 1250 through the 15th century, though found earlier and later. The most common types of drollery images appear as mixed creatures, either between different animals, or between animals and human beings, or even between animals and plants or inorganic things. Examples include cocks with human heads, dogs carrying human masks, archers winding out of a fish's mouth, bird-like dragons with an elephant's head on the back. Often they have a thematic connection with the subject of the text of the page, and larger miniatures, and they usually form part of a wider scheme of decorated margins, though some are effectively doodles added later. The word comes from the French drôlerie, meaning a joke.

One manuscript, The Croy Hours, has so many it has become known as The Book of Drolleries. Another manuscript that contains many drolleries is the English Luttrell Psalter, which has hybrid creatures and other monsters on a great deal of the pages. This comes from the East Anglian school of illumination, which was especially fond of adding drolleries. The Taymouth Hours, Gorleston Psalter, and Smithfield Decretals are other examples; all four are 14th-century and now in the British Library. In the Taymouth Hours the images are inside the main frame given each page, and so are strictly bas de page images rather than being "marginal". The images mix sacred subjects relevant to the text with secular ones that are not. Such images are the most plentiful sources of contemporary illustrations of ordinary life in the period, and many are often seen reproduced in modern books.

In English, "drollerie" was also a term in the 18th century for genre paintings of low-life subjects, especially those in Dutch Golden Age painting, which indeed are to some extent descended from the medieval marginal images.
