= J V S Wilkinson =

Specialist in Persian manuscripts

James Vere Stewart Wilkinson (1885-1957) was a specialist in Persian manuscripts and miniature paintings at the British Museum.

== Life ==
After winning a Classical Scholarship to Oxford, Wilkinson joined the Indian Civil Service, serving in the Northwest Frontier and United Provinces. He joined the Department of Oriental Manuscripts at the British Museum in 1924, and started working on Persian and Mughal painting. He was on the Committee of the International Exhibition of Persian Art at the Royal Academy in 1930. He left the British Museum in 1946 to take up the role of Librarian at the Chester Beatty Collection in London and later Dublin. He helped to select the Mughal miniatures for the International Exhibition of Indian Art at the Royal Academy, 1947–48.

A sundial was gifted and placed in the garden at Pembroke College, Cambridge, in his memory, from his friend Professor Arthur J. Arberry, Fellow of Pembroke.

== Selected publications ==
- (with Laurence Binyon, Persian Miniature Painting: Including a Critical and Descriptive Catalogue of the Miniatures Exhibited at Burlington House, January–March, 1931, exh. cat., Oxford University Press (NY) and Oxford University Press (UK) (London, England, 1933).
- (with James Fuller Blumhardt), Second supplementary catalogue of Bengali books in the library of the British Museum acquired during the years 1911-1934 (London: British Museum, 1939)
- (with Basil Gray and Laurence Binyon) Persian Miniature Painting, 3 vols (London: 1933)
- Mughal painting (London: Faber and Faber, 1948)
- The lights of Canopus: Anvar I Suhaili (1929)
- Catalogue of the Indian Miniatures in the Chester Beatty Library, 3 vols (1936)
- An Exhibition of Japanese Prints from the Collection of Sir Chester Beatty, etc. (Dublin, 1955)
